This is a list of Conservative Party MPs.  It includes all Members of Parliament elected to the British House of Commons representing the Conservative Party from 1834 onwards.  Members of the Scottish Parliament, the Welsh Assembly or the European Parliament are not listed. The provided period of a member's tenure as a constituency MP is only relevant to those times that member was also party to the Conservative whip. Those in italics are overall leaders of the Conservative Party, those in bold are Prime Ministers.


List of MPs

A
Benjamin St John Ackers; MP for West Gloucestershire (1885)
James Ackers; MP for Ludlow (1841–1847)
Sir Thomas Dyke Acland, 10th Baronet; MP for North Devon (1837–1857)
Sir Thomas Dyke Acland, 11th Baronet; MP for West Somerset (1837–1847)
Sir Gilbert Acland-Troyte; MP for Tiverton (1924–1945)
William à Court-Holmes; MP for Isle of Wight (1837–1847)
William Acton; MP for Wicklow (1841–1848)
William Augustus Adam; MP for Woolwich (1910)
Nigel Adams; MP for Selby and Ainsty (2010–present)
Vyvyan Adams; MP for Leeds West (1931–1945)
Charles Adderley; MP for Staffordshire North (1841–1878)
William Addington; MP for Devizes (1863–1864)
John Addison; MP for Ashton under Lyne (1885–1895)
Robert Adley; MP for Bristol North East (1970–1974), Christchurch and Lymington (1974–1983) and Christchurch (1983–1993)
Bim Afolami; MP for Hitchin and Harpenden (2017–present)
Adam Afriyie; MP for Windsor (2005–present)
Sir James Agg-Gardner; MP for Cheltenham (1874–1880; 1885–1895; 1900–1906; 1911–1928)
Sir Peter Agnew, 1st Baronet; MP for Camborne (1931–1950) and South Worcestershire (1955–1966)
Imran Ahmad Khan; MP for Wakefield (2019–2021)
Nickie Aiken; MP for Cities of London and Westminster (2019–present)
Peter Ainsworth; MP for East Surrey (1992–2010)
Sir John Aird, 1st Baronet; MP for Paddington North (1887–1906)
Jonathan Aitken; MP for Thanet East (1974–1983) and South Thanet (1983–1997)
Max Aitken; MP for Ashton under Lyne (1910–1916)
Sir Max Aitken; MP for Holborn (1945–1950)
Sir William Aitken; MP for Bury St Edmunds (1950–1964)
Aretas Akers-Douglas; MP for East Kent (1880–1885) and St Augustine's (1885–1911)
Sir Irving Albery; MP for Gravesend (1924–1945)
Peter Aldous; MP for Waveney (2010–present)
John Aldridge; MP for Horsham (1868–1869)
Sir Claud Alexander; MP for Ayrshire South (1874–1885)
James Alexander, 2nd Viscount Alexander; MP for Tyrone (1837–1839)
Richard Alexander; MP for Newark (1979–1997)
Michael Alison; MP for Barkston Ash (1964–1983) and Selby (1983–1997)
Lucy Allan; MP for Telford (2015–present)
Robert Allan; MP for Paddington South (1951–1966)
James Allason; MP for Hemel Hempstead (1959–1974)
Rupert Allason; MP for Torbay (1987–1997)
John Derby Allcroft; MP for Worcester (1878–1880)
Heidi Allen; MP for South Cambridgeshire (2015–2019)
John Sandeman Allen; MP for Liverpool West Derby (1924–1935)
John Sandeman Allen; MP for Birkenhead West (1931–1945)
Augustus Henry Eden Allhusen; MP for Salisbury (1897–1900) and Hackney Central (1900–1906)
Alfred Percy Allsopp; MP for Taunton (1887–1895)
George Allsopp; MP for Worcester (1885–1906)
Sir Henry Allsopp; MP for East Worcestershire (1874–1880)
Samuel Allsopp; MP for East Staffordshire (1873–1880) and Taunton (1882–1887)
Cuthbert Alport; MP for Colchester (1950–1961) 
Richard Alsager; MP for East Surrey (1835–1841)
Julian Amery; MP for Preston North (1950–1966) and Brighton Pavilion (1969–1992)
Leo Amery; MP for Birmingham South (1911–1918) and Birmingham Sparkbrook (1918–1945)
Sir David Amess; MP for Basildon (1983–1997) and Southend West (1997–2021) 
Alan Amos; MP for Hexham (1987–1992)
Sir Alan Anderson; MP for City of London (1935–1940) 
David Anderson; MP for Dumfriesshire (1963–1964) 
Lee Anderson; MP for Ashfield (2019–present)
Stuart Anderson; MP for Wolverhampton South West (2019–present)
Stuart Andrew; MP for Pudsey (2010–present)
Arthur Annesley, 11th Viscount Valentia; MP for Oxford (1895–1917) 
Hugh Annesley; MP for Cavan (1857–1874) 
Caroline Ansell; MP for Eastbourne (2015–2017; 2019–present) 
William Anstruther-Gray; MP for St Andrews Burghs (1906–1910; 1910–1918) 
William Anstruther-Gray; MP for North Lanarkshire (1931–1945) and Berwick and East Lothian (1951–1966)
Sir Edmund Antrobus, 3rd Baronet; MP for East Surrey (1841–1847)
Gerald Arbuthnot; MP for Burnley (1910)
Sir Hugh Arbuthnot; MP for Kincardineshire (1834–1865)
James Arbuthnot; MP for Wanstead and Woodford (1987–1997) and North East Hampshire (1997–2015)
Sir John Arbuthnot, 1st Baronet; MP for Dover (1950–1964)
Sir Edward Archdale, 1st Baronet; MP for North Fermanagh (1898–1903; 1916–1922)
Mervyn Edward Archdale; MP for Fermanagh (1834–1874)
William Humphrys Archdale; MP for Fermanagh (1874–1885)
Jeffrey Archer; MP for Louth, Lincolnshire (1969–1974)
Martin Archer-Shee; MP for Finsbury Central (1910–1918) and Finsbury (1918–1923)
Edward Argar; MP for Charnwood (2015–present)
Francis Arkwright; MP for East Derbyshire (1874–1880)
Alfred Arnold; MP for Halifax (1895–1900)
Jacques Arnold; MP for Gravesham (1987–1997)
Sir Tom Arnold; MP for Hazel Grove (1974–1997)
Hugh Oakeley Arnold-Forster; MP for Belfast West (1892–1906) and Croydon (1906–1909) 
David Ashby; MP for North West Leicestershire (1983–1997) 
Wilfrid Ashley; MP for Blackpool (1906–1918), Fylde (1918–1922) and New Forest and Christchurch (1922–1932)
Sir Ellis Ashmead-Bartlett; MP for Eye (1880–1885) and Sheffield Ecclesall (1885–1902)
Ellis Ashmead-Bartlett; MP for Hammersmith North (1924–1926) 
Sir Hubert Ashton; MP for Chelmsford (1950–1964) 
John Aspinall; MP for Clitheroe (1853)
Jack Aspinwall; MP for Kingswood (1979–1983) and Wansdyke (1983–1997)
Ralph Assheton; MP for Clitheroe (1868–1880)
Ralph Assheton; MP for Rushcliffe (1934–1945), City of London (1945–1950) and Blackburn West (1950–1955)
John Harvey Astell; MP for Cambridge (1852–1853) and Ashburton (1859–1865)
Sir John Dugdale Astley, 3rd Baronet; MP for North Lincolnshire (1874–1880)
John Jacob Astor; MP for Dover (1922–1945)
Sir John Astor; MP for Plymouth Sutton (1951–1959)
Sir John Astor; MP for Plymouth Sutton (1951–1959)
John Astor; MP for Newbury (1964–1974)
Michael Astor; MP for East Surrey (1945–1951)
Nancy Astor; MP for Plymouth Sutton (1919–1945)
Waldorf Astor; MP for Plymouth (1910–1918) and Plymouth Sutton (1918–1919)
William Astor; MP for Fulham East (1935–1945) and Wycombe (1951–1952)
Sarah Atherton; MP for Wrexham (2019–present)
Albert Atkey; MP for Nottingham Central (1918–1922)
Humphrey Atkins; MP for Merton and Morden (1955–1970) and Spelthorne (1970–1987)
Sir Robert Atkins; MP for Preston North (1979–1983) and South Ribble (1983–1997)
Victoria Atkins; MP for Louth and Horncastle (2015–present)
Sir Cyril Atkinson; MP for Altrincham (1924–1933)
David Atkinson; MP for Bournemouth East (1977–2005)
Peter Atkinson; MP for Hexham (1992–2010)
John Attwood; MP for Harwich (1841–1847)
Matthias Attwood; MP for Whitehaven (1834–1837)
Matthias Wolverley Attwood; MP for Greenwich (1837–1841)
Sir Henry Aubrey-Fletcher, 4th Baronet; MP for Horsham (1880–1885) and Lewes (1885–1910)
Thomas Austen; MP for West Kent (1845–1847)
Sir Herbert Austin; MP for Birmingham King's Norton (1918–1924)
Daniel Awdry; MP for Chippenham (1962–1979)

B
Gareth Bacon; MP for Orpington (2019–present)
Richard Bacon; MP for South Norfolk (2001–present)
Kemi Badenoch; MP for Saffron Walden (2017–present)
Sir George Baden-Powell; MP for Liverpool Kirkdale (1885–1898)
Sir Richard Baggallay; MP for Hereford (1865–1868) and Mid Surrey (1870–1875)
Eric Bailey; MP for Manchester Gorton (1931–1935)
Shaun Bailey; MP for West Bromwich West (2019–present)
Henry Baillie; MP for Inverness-shire (1840–1868)
Siobhan Baillie; MP for Stroud (2019–present)
Alexander Baillie-Cochrane; MP for Bridport (1841–1846), Lanarkshire (1857), Honiton (1859–1868) and Isle of Wight (1870–1880)
James Baird; MP for Falkirk Burghs (1851–1857)
Sir John Baird, 2nd Baronet; MP for Rugby (1910–1922) and Ayr Burghs (1922–1925)
William Baird; MP for Falkirk Burghs (1841–1846)
Duncan Baker; MP for North Norfolk (2019–present)
Kenneth Baker; MP for Acton (1968–1970), St Marylebone (1970–1983) and Mole Valley (1983–1997)
Sir Nicholas Baker; MP for North Dorset (1979–1997)
Peter Baker; MP for South Norfolk (1950–1954)
Steve Baker; MP for Wycombe (2010–present)
Wilfred Baker; MP for Banffshire (1964–1974)
John Baldock; MP for Harborough (1950–1959)
Sir Tony Baldry; MP for Banbury (1983–2015)
Alfred Baldwin; MP for Bewdley (1892–1908)
Sir Archer Baldwin; MP for Leominster (1945–1959)
Harriett Baldwin; MP for West Worcestershire (2010–present)
Sir Stanley Baldwin; MP for Bewdley (1908–1937)
Sir Arthur Balfour; MP for Hertford (1874–1885), Manchester East (1885–1906) and City of London (1906–1922)
Gerald Balfour; MP for Leeds Central (1885–1906)
Harold Balfour; MP for Isle of Thanet (1929–1945)
James Maitland Balfour; MP for Haddington Burghs (1841–1847)
Kenneth Balfour; MP for Christchurch (1900–1906)
John Thomas Ball; MP for Dublin University (1868–1875)
Sir Frederick Banbury, 1st Baronet; MP for Peckham (1892–1906) and City of London (1906–1924)
Cyril Banks; MP for Pudsey (1950–1959)
Robert Banks; MP for Harrogate (1974–1997)
Anthony Barber; MP for Doncaster (1951–1964) and Altrincham and Sale (1965–1974) 
Steve Barclay; MP for North East Cambridgeshire (2010–present)
Sir Malcolm Barclay-Harvey; MP for Kincardine and Aberdeenshire West (1923–1929; 1931–1939) 
Guy Baring; MP for Winchester (1906–1916) 
Henry Bingham Baring; MP for Marlborough (1834–1847) 
Thomas Baring; MP for Essex South (1874–1885) and City of London (1887–1891)
Greg Barker; MP for Bexhill and Battle (2001–2015) 
Sir John Barlow, 2nd Baronet; MP for Middleton and Prestwich (1951–1966) 
John Barneby; MP for Droitwich (1835–1837) and East Worcestershire (1837–1846) 
John Baron; MP for Billericay (2001–2010) and Basildon and Billericay (2010–present)
Sir William Bagge, 1st Baronet; MP for West Norfolk (1837–1857; 1865–1880) 
Sir Edmund Bartley-Denniss; MP for Oldham (1911–1922)
Basil Barton; MP for Kingston upon Hull Central (1931–1935)
Sir Walter Barttelot, 1st Baronet; MP for West Sussex (1860–1885) and Horsham (1885–1893)
Michael Bates; MP for Langbaurgh (1992–1997)
Sir Thomas Bateson, 2nd Baronet; MP for Londonderry (1844–1857) and Devizes (1864–1885)
Allen Bathurst, Lord Apsley; MP for Southampton (1922–1929) and Bristol Central (1931–1942)
Violet Bathurst, Lady Apsley; MP for Bristol Central (1943–1945)
Benjamin Bathurst; MP for Cirencester (1895–1906; 1910–1918)
Spencer Batiste; MP for Elmet (1983–1997)
Sir Brian Batsford; MP for Ealing South (1958–1974)
Arthur Anthony Baumann; MP for Peckham (1885–1892)
Sir Arthur Beverley Baxter; MP for Wood Green (1935–1950) and Southgate (1950–1964)
Simon Baynes; MP for Clwyd South (2019–present)
Bramston Beach; MP for North Hampshire (1857–1885) and Andover (1885–1901)
Tufton Beamish; MP for Lewes (1924–1931; 1936–1945)
Sir Tufton Beamish; MP for Lewes (1945–1974)
David Beatty, 2nd Viscount Borodale; MP for Peckham (1931–1936)
Ralph Beaumont; MP for Portsmouth Central (1931–1945)
Sir Anthony Beaumont-Dark; MP for Birmingham Selly Oak (1979–1992)
Guto Bebb; MP for Aberconwy (2010–2019)
Sir Edmund Beckett, 4th Baronet; MP for West Riding of Yorkshire (1841–1847; 1848–1859)
Ernest Beckett; MP for Whitby (1885–1905)
Sir Gervase Beckett, 1st Baronet; MP for Whitby (1906–1918), Scarborough and Whitby (1918–1922) and Leeds North (1923–1929)
Sir Alfred Beit, 2nd Baronet; MP for St Pancras South East (1931–1945)
Aaron Bell; MP for Newcastle-under-Lyme (2019–present)
Charles Bell; MP for City of London (1868–1869)
Philip Bell; MP for Bolton East (1951–1960)
Sir Ronald Bell; MP for South Buckinghamshire (1950–1974) and Beaconsfield (1974–1982)
Carlyon Bellairs; MP for King's Lynn (1906–1910) and Maidstone (1915–1931)
Sir Henry Bellingham; MP for North West Norfolk (1983–1997; 2001–2019)
Sir Henry Howe Bemrose; MP for Derby (1895–1900)
Vivian Bendall; MP for Ilford North (1978–1997)
Sir Arthur Benn, 1st Baronet; MP for Plymouth (1910–1918), Plymouth Drake (1918–1929) and Sheffield Park (1931–1935)
Sir Ion Hamilton Benn, 1st Baronet; MP for Greenwich (1910–1922)
Sir Albert Bennett, 1st Baronet; MP for Nottingham Central (1924–1930)
Sir Frederic Bennett; MP for Reading North (1951–1955), Torquay (1955–1974) and Torbay (1974–1987)
Nicholas Bennett; MP for Pembrokeshire (1987–1992)
Sir Peter Bennett; MP for Birmingham Edgbaston (1940–1953)
Sir Reginald Bennett; MP for Gosport & Fareham (1950–1974) and Fareham (1974–1979)
Lord George Bentinck; MP for King's Lynn (1834–1848)
Scott Benton; MP for Blackpool South (2019–present)
Richard Benyon; MP for Newbury (2005–2019; 2019)
Thomas Benyon; MP for Abingdon (1979–1983)
Sir Bill Benyon; MP for Buckingham (1970–1983) and Milton Keynes (1983–1992)
John Bercow; MP for Buckingham (1997–2009)
Lord Charles Beresford; MP for County Waterford (1874–1880), Marylebone East (1885–1889), York (1898–1900), Woolwich (1902–1903) and Portsmouth (1910–1916)
George Beresford; MP for Athlone (1841–1842)
Sir John Beresford, 1st Baronet; MP for Chatham (1835–1837)
Sir Paul Beresford; MP for Croydon Central (1992–1997) and Mole Valley (1997–present)
William Beresford; MP for Harwich (1841–1847) and North Essex (1847–1865)
Humphry Berkeley; MP for Lancaster (1959–1966)
Francis Bernard, 3rd Viscount Bernard; MP for Bandon (1842–1856) 
Henry Boyle Bernard; MP for Bandon (1863–1868) 
Percy Bernard; MP for Bandon (1880)
William Smyth Bernard; MP for Bandon (1834–1835; 1857–1863) 
Sir Anthony Berry; MP for Southgate (1964–1983) and Enfield Southgate (1983–1984)
Jake Berry; MP for Rossendale and Darwen (2010–present)
Lionel Berry; MP for Buckingham (1943–1945)
Keith Best; MP for Anglesey (1979–1983) and Ynys Môn (1983–1987)
Albert Bethel; MP for Eccles (1924–1929)
Sir Henry Betterton, 1st Baronet; MP for Rushcliffe (1918–1934)
David Bevan; MP for Birmingham Yardley (1979–1992)
Reginald Bevins; MP for Liverpool Toxteth (1950–1964)
Saqib Bhatti; MP for Meriden (2019–present)
Sir Mancherjee Bhownaggree; MP for Bethnal Green North East (1895–1906)
John Bidgood; MP for Bury and Radcliffe (1955–1964)
John Biffen; MP for Oswestry (1961–1983) and North Shropshire (1983–1997)
Sir John Biggs-Davison; MP for Chigwell (1955–1974) and Epping Forest (1974–1988)
James Bigwood; MP for Finsbury East (1885–1886) and Brentford (1886–1906)
Charles Bill; MP for Leek (1892–1906)
George Bingham, 5th Earl of Lucan; MP for Chertsey (1904–1906)
Richard Bingham; MP for Liverpool Garston (1957–1966)
Brian Binley; MP for Northampton South (2005–2015)
Sir Alfred Bird, 1st Baronet; MP for Wolverhampton West (1910–1922)
Sir Robert Bird, 2nd Baronet; MP for Wolverhampton West (1922–1929; 1931–1945)
Sir Edward Birkbeck, 1st Baronet; MP for North Norfolk (1879–1885) and East Norfolk (1885–1892)
Sir Patrick Bishop; MP for Harrow Central (1950–1964)
Sir Cyril Black; MP for Wimbledon (1950–1970)
John Blackburn; MP for Dudley West (1979–1994)
John Ireland Blackburne; MP for Warrington (1835–1857)
John Ireland Blackburne; MP for South West Lancashire (1875–1885)
Bob Blackman; MP for Harrow East (2010–present)
William Seymour Blackstone; MP for Wallingford (1834–1852)
Nicola Blackwood; MP for Oxford West and Abingdon (2010–2017)
Peter Blaker; MP for Blackpool South (1964–1992)
Crispin Blunt; MP for Reigate (1997–present)
Tom Boardman; MP for Leicester South West (1967–1974) and Leicester South (1974)
Sir Richard Body; MP for Billericay (1955–1959), Holland with Boston (1966–1997) and Boston and Skegness (1997–2001)
Henry George Boldero; MP for Chippenham (1835–1859)
Sir Dennis Boles; MP for Wellington (Somerset) (1911–1918) and Taunton (1918–1921)
Dennis Boles; MP for Wells (1939–1951)
Nick Boles; MP for Grantham and Stamford (2010–2019)
William Bolling; MP for Bolton (1834–1841; 1847–1848)
Joshua Bond; MP for Armagh City (1855–1857; 1859–1865)
Peter Bone; MP for Wellingborough (2005–present)
Francis Robert Bonham; MP for Harwich (1835–1837)
Sir Nicholas Bonsor, 4th Baronet; MP for Nantwich (1979–1983) and Upminster (1983–1997)
Thomas Boord; MP for Greenwich (1873–1895)
Hartley Booth; MP for Finchley (1992–1997)
Sir Robert Boothby; MP for Aberdeen and Kincardine East (1924–1950) and East Aberdeenshire (1950–1958)
George Borwick; MP for Croydon North (1918–1922)
Victoria Borwick; MP for Kensington (2015–2017)
Robert Boscawen; MP for Wells (1970–1983) and Somerton and Frome (1983–1992)
Sir Alfred Bossom, 1st Baronet; MP for Maidstone (1931–1959)
Sir Clive Bossom, 2nd Baronet; MP for Leominster (1959–1974)
Tim Boswell; MP for Daventry (1987–2010)
Sir Peter Bottomley; MP for Woolwich West (1975–1983), Eltham (1983–1997) and Worthing West (1997–present)
Virginia Bottomley; MP for South West Surrey (1984–2005)
Sir William Boulton, 1st Baronet; MP for Sheffield Central (1931–1945)
Richard Bourke, 6th Baron Naas; MP for Kildare (1847–1852), Coleraine (1852–1857) and Cockermouth (1857–1868)
Robert Bourke; MP for King's Lynn (1868–1886)
Anthony Bourne-Arton; MP for Darlington (1959–1964)
Sir William Bovill; MP for Guildford (1857–1866)
Sir Thomas Vansittart Bowater, 1st Baronet; MP for City of London (1924–1938)
Sir Andrew Bowden; MP for Brighton Kemptown (1970–1997)
Gerald Bowden; MP for Dulwich (1983–1992)
Norman Bower; MP for Harrow (1941–1945) and Harrow West (1945–1951)
Andrew Bowie; MP for West Aberdeenshire and Kincardine (2017–present)
John Bowis; MP for Battersea (1987–1997)
Thomas Gibson Bowles; MP for King's Lynn (1892–1906; 1910)
Sir George Bowyer, 1st Baronet; MP for Buckingham (1918–1937)
Donald Box; MP for Cardiff North (1959–1966)
Sir Leslie Boyce; MP for Gloucester (1929–1945)
Sir Archibald Boyd-Carpenter; MP for Bradford North (1918–1923), Coventry (1924–1929) and Chertsey (1931–1937)
John Boyd-Carpenter; MP for Kingston-upon-Thames (1945–1972)
Sir Edward Boyle, 3rd Baronet; MP for Birmingham Handsworth (1950–1970)
Sir Rhodes Boyson; MP for Brent North (1974–1997)
Brendan Bracken; MP for Paddington North (1929–1945), Bournemouth (1945–1950) and Bournemouth East and Christchurch (1950–1952)
Langton Brackenbury; MP for Louth, Lincolnshire (1910; 1918–1920)
Ben Bradley; MP for Mansfield (2017–present)
Karen Bradley; MP for Staffordshire Moorlands (2010–present) 
Sir Graham Brady; MP for Altrincham and Sale West (1997–present)
Sir Bernard Braine; MP for Billericay (1950–1955), South East Essex (1955–1983) and Castle Point (1983–1992) 
Sir Albert Braithwaite; MP for Buckrose (1926–1945) and Harrow West (1951–1959)
Sir Gurney Braithwaite, 1st Baronet; MP for Sheffield Hillsborough (1931–1935) and Holderness (1939–1950) and Bristol North West (1950–1955)
Martin Brandon-Bravo; MP for Nottingham South (1983–1992)
Gyles Brandreth; MP for City of Chester (1992–1997)
Sir William Brass; MP for Clitheroe (1929–1945)
Suella Braverman; MP for Fareham (2015–present)
Ronald Bray; MP for Rossendale (1970–1974)
Sir Julian Brazier; MP for Canterbury (1987–2017)
Jack Brereton; MP for Stoke-on-Trent South (2017–present)
Sir William Brett; MP for Helston (1866–1868)
John Brewis; MP for Galloway (1959–1974)
George Bridgeman, 4th Viscount Newport; MP for North Shropshire (1867–1885)
William Bridgeman; MP for Oswestry (1906–1929)
Andrew Bridgen; MP for North West Leicestershire (2010–present)
Harold Briggs; MP for Manchester Blackley (1918–1923; 1924–1929)
Sir Graham Bright; MP for Luton East (1979–1983) and Luton South (1983–1997)
Steve Brine; MP for Winchester (2010–2019; 2019–present)
Sir Tatton Brinton; MP for Kidderminster (1964–1974)
Tim Brinton; MP for Gravesend (1979–1983) and Gravesham (1983–1987)
Paul Bristow; MP for Peterborough (2019–present)
Sara Britcliffe; MP for Hyndburn (2019–present)
Sir Harry Brittain; MP for Acton (1918–1929)
Leon Brittan; MP for Cleveland and Whitby (1974–1983) and Richmond (Yorks) (1983–1988)
John Broadbent; MP for Ashton-under-Lyne (1931–1935)
Sir George Broadbridge; MP for City of London (1938–1945)
Sir Edmund Brocklebank; MP for Nottingham East (1924–1929) and Liverpool Fairfield (1931–1945)
Christopher Brocklebank-Fowler; MP for King's Lynn (1970–1974) and North West Norfolk (1974–1981)
St John Brodrick; MP for West Surrey (1880–1885) and Guildford (1885–1906)
James Brokenshire; MP for Hornchurch (2005–2010) and Old Bexley and Sidcup (2010–2021)
Sir Charles Broke Vere; MP for East Suffolk (1835–1843)
Sir Walter Bromley-Davenport; MP for Knutsford (1945–1970)
Henry Brooke; MP for Hampstead (1950–1966)
Peter Brooke; MP for City of London and Westminster South (1977–1997) and Cities of London and Westminster (1997–2001)
Sir William Cunliffe Brooks, 1st Baronet; MP for East Cheshire (1869–1885) and Altrincham (1886–1892)
Richard Brooman-White; MP for Rutherglen (1951–1964)
Michael Brotherton; MP for Louth, Lincolnshire (1974–1983)
Urban Hanlon Broughton; MP for Preston (1915–1918)
Alan Grahame Brown; MP for Tottenham (1962–1964)
Sir Edward Brown; MP for Bath (1964–1979)
Michael Brown; MP for Brigg and Scunthorpe (1979–1983) and Brigg and Cleethorpes (1983–1997)
Anthony Browne; MP for South Cambridgeshire (2019–present)
John Browne; MP for Winchester (1979–1992)
Percy Browne; MP for Torrington (1959–1964)
Angela Browning; MP for Tiverton (1992–1997) and Tiverton and Honiton (1997–2010)
Adelbert Brownlow-Cust; MP for North Shropshire (1866–1867) 
Fiona Bruce; MP for Congleton (2010–present)
Lord Ernest Bruce; MP for Marlborough (1834–1847) 
Lord Henry Bruce; MP for Chippenham (1886–1892) 
Ian Bruce; MP for South Dorset (1987–2001)
Jock Bruce-Gardyne; MP for South Angus (1964–1974) and Knutsford (1979–1983)
Francis Bruen; MP for Carlow Borough (1835–1837; 1839)
Henry Bruen; MP for Carlow County (1835; 1835–1837; 1840–1852)
Henry Bruen; MP for Carlow County (1857–1880)
Peter Bruinvels; MP for Leicester East (1983–1987)
Gerald Brunskill; MP for Mid Tyrone (1910)
Sir Paul Bryan; MP for Howden (1955–1983) and Boothferry (1983–1987)
Felicity Buchan; MP for Kensington (2019–present) 
Priscilla Buchan, Lady Tweedsmuir; MP for Aberdeen South (1946–1966) 
Patrick Buchan-Hepburn; MP for East Toxteth (1931–1950) and Beckenham (1950–1957)
Alick Buchanan-Smith; MP for Angus North and Mearns (1964–1983) and Kincardine and Deeside (1983–1991) 
Sir Antony Buck; MP for Colchester (1961–1983) and Colchester North (1983–1992)
Sir Henry Buckingham; MP for Guildford (1922–1931) 
Robert Buckland; MP for South Swindon (2010–present) 
Nicholas Budgen; MP for Wolverhampton South West (1974–1997) 
Sir William Bull, 1st Baronet; MP for Hammersmith (1900–1918) and Hammersmith South (1918–1929)
Denys Bullard; MP for South West Norfolk (1951–1955) and King's Lynn (1959–1964)
Sir Eric Bullus; MP for Wembley North (1950–1974)
Esmond Bulmer; MP for Kidderminster (1974–1983) and Wyre Forest (1983–1987)
Ivor Bulmer-Thomas; MP for Keighley (1949–1950) 
Sir Frederick Burden; MP for Gillingham (1950–1983) 
William Burdett-Coutts; MP for Westminster (1885–1918) and Westminster Abbey (1918–1922)
Alex Burghart; MP for Brentwood and Ongar (2017–present)
Dennistoun Burney; MP for Uxbridge (1922–1929)
Conor Burns; MP for Bournemouth West (2010–present)
Sir Simon Burns; MP for Chelmsford (1987–1997; 2010–2017) and West Chelmsford (1997–2010)
Sir Percy Burrell, 4th Baronet; MP for New Shoreham (1862–1876)
David Burrowes; MP for Enfield Southgate (2005–2017) 
Alistair Burt; MP for Bury North (1983–1997) and North East Bedfordshire (2001–2019; 2019)
Henry Burton; MP for Sudbury (1924–1945) 
Sir Herbert Butcher, 1st Baronet; MP for Holland with Boston (1950–1966) 
Sir John Butcher, 1st Baronet; MP for York (1892–1906; 1910–1923)
John Butcher; MP for Coventry South West (1979–1997)
Sir Adam Butler; MP for Bosworth (1970–1987)
Chris Butler; MP for Warrington South (1987–1992)
Peter Butler; MP for North East Milton Keynes (1992–1997)
Richard Austen Butler; MP for Saffron Walden (1929–1965)
Rob Butler; MP for Aylesbury (2019–present)
Isaac Butt; MP for Youghal (1852–1865)
Sir John Butterfill; MP for Bournemouth West (1983–2010)
Ronald Buxton; MP for Leyton (1965–1966)

C
Jocelyn Cadbury; MP for Birmingham Northfield (1979–1982)
Sir Edward Cadogan; MP for Reading (1922–1923), Finchley (1924–1935) and Bolton (1940–1945)
George Cadogan, 4th Viscount Chelsea; MP for Bath (1873)
Henry Cadogan, 5th Viscount Chelsea; MP for Bury St Edmunds (1892–1900)
Alun Cairns; MP for Vale of Glamorgan (2010–present)
Sir Hugh Cairns; MP for Belfast (1852–1866)
David Cameron; MP for Witney (2001–2016)
Donald Cameron, 24th Lochiel of Clan Cameron; MP for Inverness-shire (1868–1885)
Bruce Campbell; MP for Oldham West (1968–1970)
Sir Edward Campbell, 1st Baronet; MP for Camberwell North West (1924–1929) and Bromley (1930–1945) 
Gordon Campbell; MP for Moray and Nairn (1959–1974) 
William Campion; MP for Lewes (1910–1924) 
John Carlisle; MP for Luton West (1979–1983) and Luton North (1983–1997)
Kenneth Carlisle
Mark Carlisle
Douglas Carnegie
Swynfen Carnegie
Robert Carr
William Compton Carr
Matthew Carrington
Edward Carson, Baron Carson
Edward Carson
Douglas Carswell; MP for Harwich (2005–2010) and Clacton (2010–2014)
Andy Carter; MP for Warrington South (2019–present)
James Cartlidge; MP for South Suffolk (2015–present)
Michael Carttiss; MP for Great Yarmouth (1983–1997)
William Carver
Sir Robert Cary, 1st Baronet
Sir Bill Cash; MP for Stone (1997–present)
Felix Cassel
James Cassels
Viscount Castlereagh (Charles Vane-Tempest-Stewart, 7th Marquess of Londonderry)
Miriam Cates; MP for Penistone and Stocksbridge (2019–present)
Maria Caulfield; MP for Lewes (2015–present)
George Cave, 1st Viscount Cave
Edward Cavendish, 10th Duke of Devonshire
William Cavendish-Bentinck, 7th Duke of Portland
Frederick Campbell, 3rd Earl Cawdor
Victor Cazalet
Thelma Cazalet-Keir
David Cecil, 6th Marquess of Exeter
Evelyn Cecil, 1st Baron Rockley
Hugh Cecil, 1st Baron Quickswood
Lord Eustace Cecil
Robert Cecil, 1st Viscount Cecil of Chelwood
William Cecil, 3rd Marquess of Exeter
Alex Chalk; MP for Cheltenham (2015–present)
Lynda Chalker; MP for Wallasey (1974–1992)
Sir Austen Chamberlain; MP for East Worcestershire (1912–1914) and Birmingham West (1914–1937)
Neville Chamberlain; MP for Birmingham Ladywood (1918–1929) and Birmingham Edgbaston (1929–1940)
Sir Henry Channon; MP for Southend (1935–1950) and Southend West (1950–1958)
Paul Channon; MP for Southend West (1959–1997)
Henry Chaplin, 1st Viscount Chaplin
Judith Chaplin; MP for Newbury (1992–1993)
Sir Robert Chapman, 1st Baronet
Sydney Chapman
Albany Charlesworth; MP for Wakefield (1892–1895)
John Charlesworth; MP for Wakefield (1857–1859)
Christopher Chataway; MP for Lewisham North (1959–1966) and Chichester (1969–1974)
Hedges Eyre Chatterton
George Tomkyns Chesney
Sir Watson Cheyne, 1st Baronet
Lord Arthur Chichester
Lord John Chichester
Sir Smith Child, 1st Baronet
Sir Smith Child, 2nd Baronet
Alexander William Chisholm; MP for Inverness-shire (1835–1838)
Rehman Chishti; MP for Gillingham and Rainham (2010–present)
Hugh Cholmondeley, 2nd Baron Delamere
William Cholmondeley, 3rd Marquess of Cholmondeley
Sir Christopher Chope; MP for Southampton Itchen (1983–1992) and Christchurch (1997–present)
James Christie
William Christmas; MP for Waterford City (1834–1835; 1841–1842)
Jo Churchill; MP for Bury St Edmunds (2015–present)
Lord Randolph Churchill; MP for Woodstock (1874–1885) and Paddington South (1885–1895)
Randolph Churchill; MP for Preston (1940–1945)
Sir Winston Churchill; MP for Oldham (1900–1906) Manchester North West, (1906-1908) Dundee (1908-1922), Epping (1924–1945) and Woodford (1945–1964)
Winston Churchill; MP for Stretford (1970–1983) and Davyhulme (1983–1997)
James Clappison; MP for Hertsmere (1992–2015)
Alan Clark; MP for Plymouth Sutton (1974–1992) and Kensington and Chelsea (1997–1999)
Colin Clark; MP for Gordon (2017–2019)
Greg Clark; MP for Tunbridge Wells (2005–2019; 2019–present)
Michael Clark; MP for Rochford (1983–1997) and Rayleigh (1997–2001)
Sir William Clark; MP for Nottingham South (1959–1966), East Surrey (1970–1974) and Croydon South (1974–1992)   
Kenneth Clarke; MP for Rushcliffe (1970–2019) 
Simon Clarke; MP for Middlesbrough South and East Cleveland (2017–present) 
Terence Clarke; MP for Portsmouth West (1950–1966)
Theo Clarke; MP for Stafford (2019–present)
Brendan Clarke-Smith; MP for Bassetlaw (2019–present) 
Chris Clarkson; MP for Heywood and Middleton (2019–present) 
Sir Reginald Clarry; MP for Newport (1922–1929; 1931–1945)
Nathaniel George Clayton; MP for Hexham (1892–1893)
Leonard Cleaver; MP for Birmingham Yardley (1959–1964)
Sir Walter Clegg; MP for North Fylde (1966–1983) and Wyre (1983–1987)
James Cleverly; MP for Braintree (2015–present)
Douglas Clifton Brown; MP for Hexham (1918–1923; 1924–1943)
Howard Clifton Brown; MP for Newbury (1922–1924; 1924–1945)
Geoffrey Clifton-Brown; MP for Bury St Edmunds (1945–1950)
Sir Geoffrey Clifton-Brown; MP for Cirencester and Tewkesbury (1992–1997), Cotswold (1997–2010) and The Cotswolds (2010–present)
Robert Henry Clive
James Avon Clyde, Lord Clyde
James Latham Clyde, Lord Clyde
Sir Stuart Coats, 2nd Baronet; MP for Wimbledon (1916–1918) and East Surrey (1918–1922)
Edward Cobb
Sir George Cockburn, 10th Baronet
Eric Cockeram
John Cockroft
Sebastian Coe; MP for Falmouth and Camborne (1992–1997)
Thérèse Coffey; MP for Suffolk Coastal (2010–present)
Brunel Cohen; MP for Liverpool Fairfield (1918–1931)
Elliot Colburn; MP for Carshalton and Wallington (2019–present)
Arthur Henry Cole; MP for Enniskillen (1834–1844)
Henry Cole; MP for Enniskillen (1844–1851) and Fermanagh (1851–1880)
John Lowry Cole; MP for Enniskillen (1859–1868)
Lowry Cole, 4th Viscount Cole; MP for Enniskillen (1880–1885)
Norman Cole; MP for South Bedfordshire (1951–1966)
William Cole, 3rd Viscount Cole; MP for Fermanagh (1834–1840)
Philip Colfox
Richard Collard
Jesse Collings
Damian Collins; MP for Folkestone and Hythe (2010–present)
Tim Collins; MP for Westmorland and Lonsdale (1997–2005)
John Colomb
John Colville, 1st Baron Clydesmuir
Michael Colvin
Alberto Costa; MP for South Leicestershire (2015–present)
Sir Roger Conant, 1st Baronet
David Congdon
Henry Francis Compton; MP for New Forest (1905–1906)
Derek Conway; MP for Shrewsbury and Atcham (1983–1997) and Old Bexley and Sidcup (2001–2008)
Sir Martin Conway; MP for Combined English Universities (1918–1931)
Sir Thomas Cook; MP for North Norfolk (1931–1945)
Gresham Cooke; MP for Twickenham (1955–1970)
Robert Cooke; MP for Bristol West (1957–1979)
Anthony Coombs
Derek Coombs
Simon Coombs; MP for Swindon (1983–1997)
Octavius Coope; MP for Great Yarmouth (1847–1848), Middlesex (1874–1885) and Brentford (1885–1886)  
Thomas Cooper, 1st Baron Cooper of Culross
Albert Cooper
Duff Cooper
Neill Cooper-Key
John Cope, Baron Cope of Berkeley
William Cope, 1st Baron Cope
Thomas Corbett; MP for North Lincolnshire (1835–1837)
Thomas Lorimer Corbett; MP for North Down (1890–1910) 
John Cordeaux
John Cordle
Frederick Corfield
Patrick Cormack
Fiennes Cornwallis, 1st Baron Cornwallis
John Corrie
Sir James Corry, 1st Baronet
Albert Costain
James Couchman
Michael Coulson
John Sewell Courtauld
Philip Courtenay; MP for Bridgwater (1837–1841)
Anthony Courtney; MP for Harrow East (1959–1966)
Robert Courts; MP for Witney (2016–present)
Claire Coutinho; MP for East Surrey (2019–present)
William Henry Cowan
Sir Geoffrey Cox; MP for Torridge and West Devon (2005–present)
Irwin Cox
Stephen Crabb; MP for Preseli Pembrokeshire (2005–present)
Beresford Craddock
Reginald Craddock
John Craik-Henderson
James Cran
James Gascoyne-Cecil, 2nd Marquess of Salisbury
William Craven-Ellis
Aidan Crawley
Sir Cresswell Cresswell; MP for Liverpool (1837–1842)
John Crichton, 4th Viscount Crichton; MP for Enniskillen (1868–1880) and Fermanagh (1880–1885)
Lord Colum Crichton-Stuart
Charles Cripps, 1st Baron Parmoor
William Cripps
Alfred Critchley
Julian Critchley
Henry Page Croft, 1st Baron Croft
Chichester Crookshank; MP for Berwick and Haddington (1924–1929) and Bootle (1931–1935)
Harry Crookshank; MP for Gainsborough (1924–1956) 
Virginia Crosbie; MP for Ynys Môn (2019–present) 
Richard Assheton Cross
Sir Ronald Cross, 1st Baronet
Oliver Crosthwaite-Eyre
David Crouch
Tracey Crouch: MP for Chatham and Aylesford (2010–present) 
John Crowder
Petre Crowder
Bernard Cruddas: MP for Wansbeck (1931–1940) 
William Cruddas; MP for Newcastle-upon-Tyne (1895–1900) 
George Cubitt, 1st Baron Ashcombe
Henry Cubitt, 2nd Baron Ashcombe
William Cubitt
John Cuffe, 3rd Viscount Castlecuffe; MP for Ipswich (1842)
Charles Cumming-Bruce; MP for Inverness Burghs (1834–1837) and Elginshire and Nairnshire (1840–1868)
Philip Cunliffe-Lister, 1st Earl of Swinton
Knox Cunningham
Alec Cunningham-Reid; MP for Warrington (1922–1923; 1924–1929) and St Marylebone (1932–1942)
Charles Curran
Edwina Currie; MP for South Derbyshire (1983–1997)
David Curry
Francis Curzon, 5th Earl Howe
George Curzon, 1st Marquess Curzon of Kedleston
Harry Cust; MP for Stamford (1890–1895) and Bermondsey (1900–1906)

D
Sir John Dalrymple-Hay, 3rd Baronet; MP for Wakefield (1862–1865), Stamford (1866–1880) and Wigtown Burghs (1880–1885)
Sir Godfrey Dalrymple-White, 1st Baronet; MP for Southport (1910–1923; 1924–1931)
James Daly; MP for Bury North (2019–present)
James Dance; MP for Bromsgrove (1955–1971)
Charles Darling; MP for Deptford (1888–1897)
Sir William Darling; MP for Edinburgh South (1945–1957)
Frances Davidson, Viscountess Davidson; MP for Hemel Hempstead (1937–1959)
John Colin Campbell Davidson; MP for Hemel Hempstead (1920–1923; 1924–1937)
Chris Davies; MP for Brecon and Radnorshire (2015–2019)
David Davies; MP for Monmouth (2005–present)
Gareth Davies; MP for Grantham and Stamford (2019–present)
George Davies; MP for Yeovil (1923–1945)
Glyn Davies; MP for Montgomeryshire (2010–2019)
James Davies; MP for Vale of Clwyd (2015–2017; 2019–present)
John Davies; MP for Knutsford (1970–1978)
Mims Davies; MP for Eastleigh (2015–2019) and Mid Sussex (2019–present)
Nigel Davies; MP for Epping (1950–1951)
Philip Davies; MP for Shipley (2005–present)
Quentin Davies; MP for Stamford and Spalding (1983–1997) and Grantham and Stamford (1997–2007)
Wyndham Davies; MP for Birmingham Perry Barr (1964–1966)
Henry d'Avigdor-Goldsmid
James d'Avigdor-Goldsmid
David Davis; MP for Boothferry (1987–1997) and Haltemprice and Howden (1997–present)
Dehenna Davison; MP for Bishop Auckland (2019–present)
Richard Davison; MP for Belfast (1852–1860)
William Davison, 1st Baron Broughshane
Stephen Day; MP for Cheadle (1987–2001)
Arthur Dean; MP for Holland with Boston (1924–1929)
Paul Dean, Baron Dean of Harptree
Percy Thompson Dean
Bill Deedes; MP for Ashford (1950–1974)
Basil de Ferranti
Thomas de Grey, 6th Baron Walsingham
Henry de Worms; MP for Greenwich (1880–1885) and Liverpool East Toxteth (1885–1895)
John McAusland Denny; MP for Kilmarnock Burghs (1895–1906)
Alfred Arthur Hinchcliffe Denville
James Despencer-Robertson
Nirj Deva; MP for Brentford and Isleworth (1992–1997)
Tim Devlin; MP for Stockton South (1987–1997)
Geoffrey Dickens; MP for Huddersfield West (1979–1983) and Littleborough and Saddleworth (1983–1995)
Terry Dicks; MP for Hayes and Harlington (1983–1997)
John Dickson, 1st Baron Islington
Edward Digby, 10th Baron Digby
Simon Wingfield Digby
Robert Dimsdale; MP for Hertford (1866–1874) and Hitchin (1885–1892)
Caroline Dinenage; MP for Gosport (2010–present)
Sarah Dines; MP for Derbyshire Dales (2019–present)
Benjamin Disraeli; MP for Maidstone (1837–1841), Shrewsbury (1841–1847) and Buckinghamshire (1847–1876)
Coningsby Disraeli; MP for Altrincham (1892–1906)
Piers Dixon; MP for Truro (1970–1974)
Jonathan Djanogly; MP for Huntingdon (2001–present)
Leo Docherty; MP for Aldershot (2017–present)
Douglas Dodds-Parker
Geoffrey Dodsworth; MP for South West Hertfordshire (1974–1979)
Charles Donaldson
Michelle Donelan; MP for Chippenham (2015–present)
Reginald Dorman-Smith
Stephen Dorrell; MP for Loughborough (1979–1997) and Charnwood (1997–2015)
Nadine Dorries; MP for Mid Bedfordshire (2005–2012; 2013–present)
Steve Double; MP for St Austell and Newquay (2015–present)
Charles Doughty; MP for East Surrey (1951–1970)
Lord James Douglas-Hamilton; MP for Edinburgh West (1974–1997)
Lord Malcolm Douglas-Hamilton
Sir Alec Douglas-Home; MP for Lanark (1931–1945; 1950–1951) and Kinross and Western Perthshire (1963–1974) 
Den Dover; MP for Chorley (1979–1997)
Oliver Dowden; MP for Hertsmere (2015–present)
Jackie Doyle-Price; MP for Thurrock (2010–present)
Burnaby Drayson
Richard Drax; MP for South Dorset (2010–present)
Cedric Drewe
Flick Drummond; MP for Portsmouth South (2015–2017) and Meon Valley (2019–present)
Henry Drummond Wolff
Henry Maxence Cavendish Drummond Wolff
Edward du Cann
Arthur Duckworth; MP for Shrewsbury (1929–1945)
William Baring du Pré
James Duddridge; MP for Rochford and Southend East (2005–present)
Rolf Dudley-Williams
John Dugdale; MP for Nuneaton (1886–1892)
Thomas Dugdale, 1st Baron Crathorne
Hubert Duggan
David Duguid; MP for Banff and Buchan (2017–present)
George Dunbar; MP for Belfast (1835–1837; 1838–1841)
Sir Alan Duncan; MP for Rutland and Melton (1992–2019) 
Sir James Duncan, 1st Baronet
Peter Duncan; MP for Galloway and Upper Nithsdale (2001–2005) 
Sir Iain Duncan Smith; MP for Chingford (1992–1997) and Chingford and Woodford Green (1997–present) 
Arthur Duncombe; MP for East Retford (1835–1852) and East Riding of Yorkshire (1852–1868) 
Arthur Duncombe; MP for Howdenshire (1885–1892)
Bob Dunn; MP for Dartford (1979–1997)
Philip Dunne; MP for Ludlow (2005–present)
Philip Russell Rendel Dunne
Caledon Du Pré
Tony Durant
William Duthie
Hugh Dykes, Baron Dykes

E
John Eastwood; MP for Kettering (1931–1940)
Mark Eastwood; MP for Dewsbury (2019–present)
Sir David Eccles; MP for Chippenham (1943–1962)
Peter Eckersley; MP for Manchester Exchange (1935–1940)
Sir Anthony Eden; MP for Warwick and Leamington (1923–1957)
Sir John Eden, 7th and 9th Baronet; MP for Bournemouth West (1954–1983)
Albert Edmondson, 1st Baron Sandford
Alfred Edwards; MP for Middlesbrough East (1949–1950)
Nicholas Edwards, Baron Crickhowell
Ruth Edwards; MP for Rushcliffe (2019–present)
Arthur Egerton, 3rd Earl of Wilton
George Egerton, 2nd Earl of Ellesmere
Tim Eggar; MP for Enfield North (1979–1997)
Harold Elletson; MP for Blackpool North (1992–1997)
Sir George Elliot, 1st Baronet
Walter Elliot
William Elliot; MP for Newcastle upon Tyne North (1957–1983)
Sir Robert Ellis, 1st Baronet
George Sampson Elliston
Tobias Ellwood; MP for Bournemouth East (2005–present)
Charlie Elphicke; MP for Dover (2010–2017; 2018–2019)
Natalie Elphicke; MP for Dover (2019–present)
Peter Emery
Evelyn Emmet, Baroness Emmet of Amberley
Paul Emrys-Evans
Cyril Entwistle
Eric Errington
Frederick Erroll, 1st Baron Erroll of Hale
John Erskine, Lord Erskine
Clifford Erskine-Bolst
Reginald Essenhigh
George Eustice; MP for Camborne and Redruth (2010–present)
Henry Arthur Evans
David Evans; MP for Welwyn Hatfield (1987–1997)
Jonathan Evans
Luke Evans; MP for Bosworth (2019–present)
Nigel Evans; MP for Ribble Valley (1992–2013; 2014–present)
Roger Kenneth Evans
William Evans-Gordon
Sir David Evennett; MP for Erith and Crayford (1983-1997) and Bexleyheath and Crayford (2005–present)
Ben Everitt; MP for Milton Keynes North (2019–present)
Sir William Ewart, 1st Baronet; MP for Belfast (1878–1885) and Belfast North (1885–1889)
Henry Eyre; MP for Gainsborough (1886–1892)
Sir Reginald Eyre; MP for Birmingham Hall Green (1965–1987)
Bolton Eyres-Monsell; MP for Evesham (1910–1935)

F
David Faber; MP for Westbury (1992–2001)
Sir Denison Faber; MP for York (1900–1910) and Clapham (1910–1918)
Michael Fabricant; MP for Mid Staffordshire (1992–1997) and Lichfield (1997–present)
Sir Nicholas Fairbairn; MP for Kinross and Western Perthshire (1974–1983) and Perth and Kinross (1983–1995) 
James Griffyth Fairfax; MP for Norwich (1924–1929)
Sir Russell Fairgrieve; MP for Aberdeenshire West (1974–1983)
Sheila Faith; MP for Belper (1979–1983)
Sir Bertram Falle, 1st Baronet; MP for Portsmouth (1910–1918) and Portsmouth North (1918–1934)
Sir Michael Fallon; MP for Darlington (1983–1992) and Sevenoaks (1997–2019)
Frederick Farey-Jones; MP for Watford (1955–1964)
Sir John Farr; MP for Harborough (1959–1992)
Laura Farris; MP for Newbury (2019–present)
Anthony Favell; MP for Stockport (1983–1992)
Sir Anthony Fell; MP for Yarmouth (1951–1966; 1970–1983)
Sir Arthur Fell; MP for Great Yarmouth (1906–1922)
Simon Fell; MP for Barrow and Furness (2019–present)
Peggy Fenner
Hugh Ferguson
John Ferguson
Maurice Burke Roche, 4th Baron Fermoy
Charles Duncombe, 2nd Earl of Feversham
Michael Fidler
Barry John Anthony Field
Mark Field; MP for Cities of London and Westminster (2001–2019)
Graeme Finlay
Geoffrey Finsberg
Anna Firth; MP for Southend West (2022–present)
Dudley Fishburn
Nigel Fisher
William Hayes Fisher, 1st Baron Downham
Sir Frederick Fison, 1st Baronet; MP for Doncaster (1895–1906)
Edmund FitzAlan-Howard, 1st Viscount FitzAlan of Derwent
William Vesey-FitzGerald, 2nd Baron FitzGerald and Vesey
Edward FitzRoy
Roger Fleetwood-Hesketh
David Fleming, Lord Fleming
Edward Fleming
Valentine Fleming
John Willis Fleming
Alexander Fletcher; MP for Edinburgh North (1973–1983) and Edinburgh Central (1983–1987)
Katherine Fletcher; MP for South Ribble (2019–present)
Mark Fletcher; MP for Bolsover (2019–present)
Nick Fletcher; MP for Don Valley (2019–present)
Sir Walter Fletcher; MP for Bury (1945–1950) and Bury and Radcliffe (1950–1955)
Charles Fletcher-Cooke
John Fletcher-Cooke
William Fletcher-Vane, 1st Baron Inglewood
Howard Flight
Adrian Flook; MP for Taunton (2001–2005)
Janet Fookes, Baroness Fookes
Vicky Ford; MP for Chelmsford (2017–present)
Leolin Forestier-Walker
Nigel Forman; MP for Carshalton (1976–1983) and Carshalton and Wallington (1983–1997)
Henry Forster, 1st Baron Forster
Michael Forsyth; MP for Stirling (1983–1997)
Tim Fortescue; MP for Liverpool Garston (1966–1974)
James Fortescue Flannery
Eric Forth
Sir Harry Foster; MP for Lowestoft (1892–1900; 1910) and Portsmouth Central (1924–1929)
Sir John Foster; MP for Northwich (1945–1974)
Kevin Foster; MP for Torbay (2015–present)
Sir Norman Fowler; MP for Nottingham South (1970–1974) and Sutton Coldfield (1974–2001)
Liam Fox; MP for Woodspring (1992–2010) and North Somerset (2010–present)
Sir Marcus Fox; MP for Shipley (1970–1997)
Mark Francois; MP for Rayleigh (2001–2010) and Rayleigh and Wickford (2010–present)
Cecil Franks
Christopher Fraser; MP for Mid Dorset and North Poole (1997–2001) and South West Norfolk (2005–2010)
Sir Hugh Fraser; MP for Stone (1945–1950), Stafford and Stone (1950–1983) and Stafford (1983–1984)
Ian Fraser, Baron Fraser of Lonsdale
Ian Montagu Fraser
Sir Keith Fraser, 5th Baronet; MP for Harborough (1918–1923)
Peter Fraser, Baron Fraser of Carmyllie
Lucy Frazer; MP for South East Cambridgeshire (2015–present)
Walter de Frece
George Freeman; MP for Mid Norfolk (2010–present)
Roger Freeman, Baron Freeman
Mike Freer; MP for Finchley and Golders Green (2010–present)
Denzil Freeth; MP for Basingstoke (1955–1964)
Douglas French; MP for Gloucester (1987–1997)
Louie French; MP for Old Bexley and Sidcup (2021–present)
James William Freshfield; MP for Penryn and Falmouth (1835–1841; 1852–1857) and Boston (1851–1852)
Thomas Frewen Turner; MP for South Leicestershire (1835–1836)
Sir Peter Fry; MP for Wellingborough (1969–1997)
Richard Fuller; MP for Bedford (2010–2017) and North East Bedfordshire (2019–present)
Alexander Fuller-Acland-Hood, 1st Baron St Audries
Marcus Fysh; MP for Yeovil (2015–present)

G
Anthony Gadie; MP for Bradford Central (1924–1929)
Sir Thomas Galbraith; MP for Glasgow Hillhead (1966–1982)
Sir Roger Gale; MP for North Thanet (1983–present)
Roy Galley; MP for Halifax (1983–1987)
Phil Gallie; MP for Ayr (1992–1997)
Henry Gally Knight; MP for North Nottinghamshire (1835–1846)
Sir David Gammans, 1st Baronet; MP for Hornsey (1941–1957)
Muriel Gammans; MP for Hornsey (1957–1966)
Sir George Gardiner; MP for Reigate (1974–1997)
Sir Edward Gardner; MP for Billericay (1959–1966), Fylde South (1970–1983) and Fylde (1983–1987)
Sir Ernest Gardner; MP for Wokingham (1901–1918) and Windsor (1918–1922)
Tristan Garel-Jones; MP for Watford (1979–1997)
Edward Garnier; MP for Harborough (1992–2017)
Mark Garnier; MP for Wyre Forest (2010–present)
James Gascoyne-Cecil, 11th Viscount Cranborne; MP for Darwen (1885–1892) and Rochester (1893–1903)
Robert Gascoyne-Cecil, 10th Viscount Cranborne; MP for Stamford (1853–1868)
Robert Gascoyne-Cecil, 12th Viscount Cranborne; MP for South Dorset (1929–1941)
Robert Gascoyne-Cecil, 13th Viscount Cranborne; MP for Bournemouth West (1950–1954)
Robert Gascoyne-Cecil, 14th Viscount Cranborne; MP for South Dorset (1979–1987)
James Milnes Gaskell; MP for Much Wenlock (1834–1868)
Ernest Gates; MP for Middleton and Prestwich (1940–1951)
John Gathorne-Hardy; MP for Rye (1868–1880), Mid Kent (1884–1885) and Medway (1885–1892)
David Gauke; MP for South West Hertfordshire (2005–2019)
Hamilton Gault; MP for Taunton (1924–1935)
Sir Guy Gaunt; MP for Buckrose (1922–1926)
Auckland Geddes; MP for Basingstoke (1917–1920)
Sir Eric Geddes; MP for Cambridge (1917–1922)
Robert Gee; MP for Woolwich East (1921–1922) and Bosworth (1924–1927)
John George; MP for County Wexford (1852–1857; 1859–1866)
Sir John George; MP for Glasgow Pollok (1955–1964)
Nus Ghani; MP for Wealden (2015–present)
Samuel Gibson Getty; MP for Belfast (1860–1868)
Nick Gibb; MP for Bognor Regis and Littlehampton (1997–present)
William Gibbons; MP for Bilston (1944–1945)
Edward Gibson; MP for Dublin University (1875–1885)
Peter Gibson; MP for Darlington (2019–present)
Thomas Milner Gibson
David Gibson-Watt, Baron Gibson-Watt
Jo Gideon; MP for Stoke-on-Trent Central (2019–present)
Christopher Gill; MP for Ludlow (1987–1994; 1995–2001)
Dame Cheryl Gillan; MP for Chesham and Amersham (1992–2021)
Sir Ian Gilmour, 3rd Baronet; MP for Central Norfolk (1962–1974) and Chesham and Amersham (1974–1992)
Sir John Gilmour, 2nd Baronet; MP for East Renfrewshire (1910–1918) and Glasgow Pollok (1918–1940)
Sir John Gilmour, 3rd Baronet; MP for East Fife (1961–1979) 
John Neilson Gladstone; MP for Walsall (1841), Ipswich (1842–1847) and Devizes (1852–1857; 1859–1863)
Thomas Gladstone; MP for Portarlington (1834–1835), Leicester (1835–1837) and Ipswich (1842)
William Ewart Gladstone; MP for Newark (1834–1846)
Sir Richard Atwood Glass
Gilbert Gledhill; MP for Halifax (1931–1945)
John Glen; MP for Salisbury (2010–present)
Clifford Glossop
Sir Douglas Glover; MP for Ormskirk (1953–1970)
Louis Gluckstein
Alan Glyn
Ralph Glyn, 1st Baron Glyn
Richard Glyn
Sir Stephen Glynne, 9th Baronet
Joseph Godber
Sir Park Goff
Thomas William Goff; MP for Roscommon (1859–1860)
Zac Goldsmith; MP for Richmond Park (2010–2016; 2017–2019)
Philip Goodhart
Victor Goodhew
Alastair Goodlad, Baron Goodlad
Albert Goodman
Paul Goodman; MP for Wycombe (2001–2010)
Charles Goodson-Wickes
Robert Goodwill; MP for Scarborough and Whitby (2005–present)
Matthew Gordon-Banks; MP for Southport (1992–1997)
Lord Walter Gordon-Lennox
Sir Frederic Gorell Barnes; MP for Faversham (1895–1900)
Teresa Gorman; MP for Billericay (1987–1994; 1995–2001)
John Eldon Gorst
John Michael Gorst
Frederick Gough
Henry Goulburn
Michael Gove; MP for Surrey Heath (2005–present)
Ian Gow; MP for Eastbourne (1974–1990)
Sir Raymond Gower; MP for Barry (1951–1983) and Vale of Glamorgan (1983–1989)
Sir Fergus Graham, 5th Baronet; MP for North Cumberland (1926–1935) and Darlington (1951–1959)
Luke Graham; MP for Ochil and South Perthshire (2017–2019)
Richard Graham; MP for Gloucester (2010–present)
Anthony Grant
Bill Grant; MP for Ayr, Carrick and Cumnock (2017–2019)
Francis William Grant; MP for Inverness-shire (1838–1840)
Helen Grant; MP for Maidstone and The Weald (2010–present)
Sir James Augustus Grant, 1st Baronet
Robert Grant-Ferris
Sir William Grantham; MP for East Surrey (1874–1885) and Croydon (1885–1886)
Nicholas Grattan-Doyle
Frances Marjorie Graves 
Hamish Gray, Baron Gray of Contin
James Gray; MP for North Wiltshire (1997–present)
Chris Grayling; MP for Epsom and Ewell (2001–present)
Albert Green; MP for Derby (1918–1922)
Alan Green; MP for Preston South (1955–1964; 1970–1974)
Chris Green; MP for Bolton West (2015–present)
Damian Green; MP for Ashford (1997–present)
Crawford Greene
Justine Greening; MP for Putney (2005–2019)
Harry Greenway
John Greenway
Thomas George Greenwell
Hamar Greenwood, 1st Viscount Greenwood
Conal Gregory
Edward Grenfell; MP for City of London (1922–1935)
William Grenfell; MP for Wycombe (1900–1905)
Dominic Grieve; MP for Beaconsfield (1997–2019)
Percy Grieve; MP for Solihull (1964–1983)
Andrew Griffith; MP for Arundel and South Downs (2019–present)
Sir Arthur Griffith-Boscawen; MP for Tunbridge (1892–1906), Dudley (1910–1921) and Taunton (1921–1922)
Andrew Griffiths; MP for Burton (2010–2018; 2018–2019)
Sir Eldon Griffiths; MP for Bury St Edmunds (1964–1992)
Kate Griffiths; MP for Burton (2019–present)
Peter Griffiths; MP for Smethwick (1964–1966) and Portsmouth North (1979–1997)
Edward Grigg, 1st Baron Altrincham
Sir James Grigg; MP for Cardiff East (1942–1945)
James Grimston, 2nd Earl of Verulam
James Grundy; MP for Leigh (2019–present)
Robert Grimston, 1st Baron Grimston of Westbury
Ian Grist
Patrick Ground; MP for Feltham and Heston (1983–1992)
Samuel Grove Price; MP for Sandwich (1835–1837)
Michael Grylls
Frederick Edward Guest
Oscar Guest
Gwendolen Guinness, 1st Viscountess Elveden
Rupert Guinness, 2nd Earl of Iveagh
Walter Guinness, 1st Baron Moyne
Jonathan Gullis; MP for Stoke-on-Trent North (2019–present)
Ben Gummer; MP for Ipswich (2010–2017)
John Gummer; MP for Lewisham West (1970–1974), Eye (1979–1983) and Suffolk Coastal (1983–2010)
Derrick Gunston
Sir Robert Gunter, 1st Baronet; MP for Knaresborough (1884–1885) and Barkston Ash (1885–1905)
Harold Gurden
Rupert Gwynne; MP for Eastbourne (1910–1924)
Sam Gyimah; MP for East Surrey (2010–2019)

H
Sir Douglas Hacking, 1st Baronet; MP for Chorley (1918–1945)
William Hague; MP for Richmond (Yorks) (1989–2015)
Kirstene Hair; MP for Angus (2017–2019)
John Halcomb; MP for Dover (1834–1835)
Robert Halfon; MP for Harlow (2010–present)
Sir Frederick Hall, 1st Baronet; MP for Dulwich (1910–1932)
Joan Hall; MP for Keighley (1970–1974) 
Luke Hall; MP for Thornbury and Yate (2015–present)
Sir Reginald Hall; MP for Liverpool West Derby (1919–1923) and Eastbourne (1925–1929)
Walter Hall; MP for Brecon and Radnorshire (1924–1929; 1931–1935)
Alfred Hall-Davis; MP for Morecambe and Lonsdale (1964–1979)
Frederick Halsey; MP for Hertfordshire (1874–1885) and Watford (1885–1906)
Sir Archie Hamilton; MP for Epsom and Ewell (1978–2001)
Lord Claud Hamilton; MP for Londonderry City (1865–1868), King's Lynn (1869–1880), Liverpool (1880–1885), Liverpool West Derby (1885–1888) and Kensington South (1910–1918)
Sir George Hamilton, 1st Baronet; MP for Altrincham (1910–1923) and Ilford (1928–1937)
Lord George Hamilton
George Alexander Hamilton
Sir James Hamilton, 2nd Baronet; MP for Sudbury (1837)
Michael Hamilton
Neil Hamilton; MP for Tatton (1983–1997)
Edward Bruce Hamley
Philip Hammond; MP for Runnymede and Weybridge (1997–2019)
Stephen Hammond; MP for Wimbledon (2005–2019; 2019–present)
Keith Hampson
Robert William Hanbury; MP for Tamworth (1872–1878), Staffordshire North (1878–1880) and Preston (1885–1903)
Matt Hancock; MP for West Suffolk (2010–present)
Henry Handcock; MP for Athlone (1856–1857)
Greg Hands; MP for Hammersmith and Fulham (2005–2010) and Chelsea and Fulham (2010–present)
Jeremy Hanley; MP for Richmond and Barnes (1983–1997)
Ian Hannah
John Hannam
Sir Charles Hanson, 1st Baronet
Reginald Hanson
Granville Harcourt-Vernon; MP for East Retford (1837–1847)
Sir John Hardy, 1st Baronet; MP for Midhurst (1859), Dartmouth (1860–1868) and Warwickshire South (1868–1874)
John Hare, 1st Viscount Blakenham
Andrew Hargreaves
Ken Hargreaves
Esmond Harmsworth, 2nd Viscount Rothermere
Mark Harper; MP for Forest of Dean (2005–present)
Richard Harrington; MP for Watford (2010–2019; 2019)
David Harris; MP for St Ives (1983–1997)
Fred Harris; MP for Croydon (1948–1970)
Rebecca Harris; MP for Castle Point (2010–present)
Frederick Rutherfoord Harris
Reader Harris
Brian Harrison; MP for Maldon (1955–1974)
Harwood Harrison
Trudy Harrison; MP for Copeland (2017–present)
Sally-Ann Hart; MP for Hastings and Rye (2019–present)
Simon Hart; MP for Carmarthen West and South Pembrokeshire (2010–present)
William Hart Dyke
Arthur Vere Harvey; MP for Macclesfield (1945–1971)
Ian Harvey; MP for Harrow East (1950–1959)
John Harvey; MP for Walthamstow East (1955–1966)
Robert Harvey; MP for Clwyd South West (1983–1987)
Betty Harvie Anderson; MP for East Renfrewshire (1959–1979)
Sir Alan Haselhurst; MP for Middleton and Prestwich (1970–1974) and Saffron Walden (1977–2017)
Michael Dobbyn Hassard
Stephen Hastings
George Hathaway-Eady; MP for Bradford Central (1931–1935)
Michael Havers, Baron Havers
Christopher Hawkins; MP for High Peak (1983–1992)
Nick Hawkins; MP for Blackpool South (1992–1997) and Surrey Heath (1997–2005)
Sir Paul Hawkins; MP for South West Norfolk (1964–1987)
Warren Hawksley
John Hay; MP for Henley (1950–1974)
Sir Edmund Samuel Hayes, 3rd Baronet; MP for Donegal (1834–1860)
Jerry Hayes; MP for Harlow (1983–1997)
John Hayes; MP for South Holland and The Deepings (1997–present)
Barney Hayhoe, Baron Hayhoe
Robert Hayward
Antony Head, 1st Viscount Head
Cuthbert Headlam
Lionel Heald
Sir Oliver Heald; MP for North Hertfordshire (1992–1997) and North East Hertfordshire (1997–present)
James Heappey; MP for Wells (2015–present)
Arthur Raymond Heath; MP for Louth, Lincolnshire (1886–1892)
Sir Edward Heath; MP for Bexley (1950–1974), Sidcup (1974–1983) and Old Bexley and Sidcup (1983–2001)
Sir James Heath, 1st Baronet
Sir William Heathcote, 5th Baronet
David Heathcoat-Amory
Derick Heathcoat Amory
Gilbert Heathcote-Drummond-Willoughby, 2nd Earl of Ancaster
Gilbert Heathcote-Drummond-Willoughby, 3rd Earl of Ancaster
Sir John Henniker Heaton; MP for Canterbury (1885–1910)
Chris Heaton-Harris; MP for Daventry (2010–present)
Peter Heaton-Jones; MP for North Devon (2015–2019)
John Heddle
Augustus Helder; MP for Whitehaven (1895–1906)
Sir Alexander Henderson, 1st Baronet; MP for West Staffordshire (1898–1906) and St George's, Hanover Square (1913–1916)
Barry Henderson; MP for East Dunbartonshire (1974), East Fife (1979–1983) and North East Fife (1983–1987)
Gordon Henderson; MP for Sittingbourne and Sheppey (2010–present)
Harold Henderson; MP for Abingdon (1910–1916)
Sir John Henderson; MP for Glasgow Cathcart (1946–1964)
Sir James Henderson-Stewart, 1st Baronet
Charles Hendry
Forbes Hendry
Sir Arthur Heneage; MP for Louth, Lincolnshire (1924–1945)
Joseph Warner Henley
Sydney Herbert Holcroft Henn
George Hennessy, 1st Baron Windlesham
John Pope Hennessy; MP for King's County (1859–1865)
John Henniker-Major, 5th Baron Henniker
Darren Henry; MP for Broxtowe (2019–present)
Charles Hepburn-Stuart-Forbes-Trefusis, 20th Baron Clinton
Joseph Hepworth
Aubrey Herbert
Dennis Herbert, 1st Baron Hemingford
George Herbert; MP for Rotherham (1931–1933)
John Arthur Herbert
Nick Herbert; MP for Arundel and South Downs (2005–2019)
Sidney Herbert; MP for South Wiltshire (1834–1846)
Sir Sidney Herbert, 1st Baronet
Edward Hermon
John Charles Herries
Michael Heseltine; MP for Tavistock (1966–1974) and Henley (1974–2001)
Sir Peter Hesketh-Fleetwood, 1st Baronet; MP for Preston (1834–1837)
Sir Frederick Heygate, 2nd Baronet; MP for Londonderry (1865–1874)
William Unwin Heygate; MP for Leicester (1861–1865) and South Leicestershire (1870–1880)
Richard Hickmet
Maureen Hicks; MP for Wolverhampton North East (1987–1992)
Sir Robert Hicks; MP for Bodmin (1970–1974; 1974–1983) and South East Cornwall (1983–1997)
Sir Michael Hicks Beach, 8th Baronet; MP for East Gloucestershire (1854)
Sir Michael Hicks Beach, 9th Baronet; MP for East Gloucestershire (1864–1885) and Bristol West (1885–1906)
Michael Hicks Beach, 2nd Viscount Quenington; MP for Tewkesbury (1906–1916)
William Whitehead Hicks Beach; MP for Cheltenham (1950–1964)
William Frederick Hicks-Beach; MP for Tewkesbury (1916–1918)
Antony Higginbotham; MP for Burnley (2019–present)
Terence Higgins, Baron Higgins
Joseph Hiley
Alexander Staveley Hill
Charles Hill, Baron Hill of Luton
Eveline Hill
Sir James Hill; MP for Southampton Test (1970–1974; 1979–1997)
John Hill; MP for South Norfolk (1955–1974)
Arthur Hill-Trevor, 1st Baron Trevor
Samuel Hill-Wood
Edward Montagu, 8th Earl of Sandwich
Ken Hind
Damian Hinds; MP for East Hampshire (2010–present)
Geoffrey Hirst
Michael Hirst; MP for Strathkelvin and Bearsden (1983–1987)
Sir Samuel Hoare, 1st Baronet; MP for Norwich (1886–1906)
Sir Samuel Hoare, 2nd Baronet; MP for Chelsea (1910–1944)
Simon Hoare; MP for North Dorset (2015–present)
Mark Hoban
Sir John Hobson; MP for Warwick and Leamington (1957–1967)
Philip Hocking
Robin Hodgson, Baron Hodgson of Astley Abbotts
Douglas Hogg; MP for St Marylebone (1922–1928)
Douglas Hogg; MP for Grantham (1979–1997) and Sleaford and North Hykeham (1997–2010)
Quintin Hogg; MP for Oxford (1938–1950) and St Marylebone (1963–1970)
Richard Holden; MP for North West Durham (2019–present)
Sir Arthur Holland; MP for Northampton (1924–1927)
Henry Holland, 1st Viscount Knutsford
Philip Holland
Christopher Holland-Martin
Sir George Hollingbery; MP for Meon Valley (2010–2019)
John Hollingworth; MP for Birmingham All Saints (1959–1964)
Kevin Hollinrake; MP for Thirsk and Malton (2015–present)
Philip Hollobone
Adam Holloway; MP for Gravesham (2005–present)
Hugh Holmes; MP for Dublin University (1885–1887)
Paul Holmes; MP for Eastleigh (2019–present)
Mary Holt
Richard Holt
Cornelius Homan
Tom Hooson
James Hope, 1st Baron Rankeillour
John Augustus Hope
John Hope-Johnstone; MP for Dumfriesshire (1834–1847; 1857–1865)
John Hope-Johnstone; MP for Dumfriesshire (1874–1880)
Alan Hopkins
Henry Hopkinson, 1st Baron Colyton
John Horam
Peter Hordern
Frank Hornby
Richard Hornby
Sir William Hornby, 1st Baronet; MP for Blackburn (1886–1910)
Robert Horne, 1st Viscount Horne of Slamannan
Patricia Hornsby-Smith
Ian Macdonald Horobin
Florence Horsbrugh, Baroness Horsbrugh
Thomas Houldsworth; MP for North Nottinghamshire (1834–1852)
Sir William Houldsworth, 1st Baronet; MP for Manchester (1883–1885) and Manchester North West (1885–1906)
Donald Howard, 3rd Baron Strathcona and Mount Royal
Gerald Howard
Greville Howard; MP for St Ives (1950–1966)
John Howard; MP for Faversham (1900–1906)
John Howard; MP for Southampton Test (1955–1964)
John Morgan Howard; MP for Dulwich (1885–1887)
Michael Howard; MP for Folkestone and Hythe (1983–2010)
Charles Howard-Bury; MP for Bilston (1922–1924) and Chelmsford (1926–1931)
Alan Howarth; MP for Stratford-on-Avon (1983–1995)
Sir Gerald Howarth; MP for Cannock and Burntwood (1983–1992) and Aldershot (1997–2017)
Sir Geoffrey Howe; MP for Bebington (1964–1966), Reigate (1970–1974) and East Surrey (1974–1992)
David Howell, Baron Howell of Guildford
John Howell; MP for Henley (2008–present)
Paul Howell; MP for Sedgefield (2019–present)
Ralph Howell
Sir James Hozier, 2nd Baronet; MP for South Lanarkshire (1886–1906)
Peter Hubbard-Miles
John Walter Huddleston
Austen Hudson
Sir Austin Hudson, 1st Baronet
Neil Hudson; MP for Penrith and The Border (2019–present)
Robert Hudson, 1st Viscount Hudson
Eddie Hughes
Robert Gurth Hughes
John Hughes-Hallett
Michael Hughes-Young, 1st Baron St Helens
Norman Hulbert
William Hume-Williams
Henry Hunloke; MP for West Derbyshire (1938–1944)
David Hunt; MP for Wirral (1976–1983) and Wirral West (1983–1997)
George Ward Hunt; MP for North Northamptonshire (1857–1877) 
Jane Hunt; MP for Loughborough (2019–present)
Jeremy Hunt; MP for South West Surrey (2005–present) 
Sir John Hunt; MP for Bromley (1964–1974) and Ravensbourne (1974–1997) 
Rowland Hunt; MP for Ludlow (1903–1917; 1917–1918) 
Tom Hunt; MP for Ipswich (2019–present) 
Andrew Hunter
Aylmer Hunter-Weston
Sir Herbert Huntington-Whiteley, 1st Baronet; MP for Ashton-under-Lyne (1895–1906) and Droitwich (1916–1918)
Sir Anthony Hurd; MP for Mid Oxfordshire (1974–1983) and Witney (1983–1997) 
Douglas Hurd; MP for Newbury (1945–1964) 
Nick Hurd; MP for Ruislip-Northwood (2005–2010) and Ruislip, Northwood and Pinner (2010–2019)
Geoffrey Hutchinson, Baron Ilford
Michael Clark Hutchison
Sir Harry Hylton-Foster; MP for York (1950–1959) and Cities of London and Westminster (1959)

I
Edward Iliffe; MP for Tamworth (1923–1929)
Sir Robert Inglis, 2nd Baronet; MP for Oxford University (1835–1854) 
Thomas Inskip; MP for Bristol Central (1918–1929) and Fareham (1931–1939) 
Thomas James Ireland; MP for Bewdley (1847–1848) 
Thomas Iremonger; MP for Ilford North (1954–1974) 
Sir Godman Irvine; MP for Rye (1955–1983) 
Michael Irvine; MP for Ipswich (1987–1992) 
Sir Charles Irving; MP for Cheltenham (1974–1992)

J
Alister Jack; MP for Dumfries and Galloway (2017–present) 
Michael Jack; MP for Fylde (1987–2010) 
Sir John Jackson; MP for Devonport (1910–1918) 
John Jackson; MP for South East Derbyshire (1959–1964) 
Joseph Devonsher Jackson; MP for Bandon (1835–1842) and Dublin University (1842)
Robert Jackson; MP for Wantage (1983–2005) 
Sir Stanley Jackson; MP for Howdenshire (1915–1926) 
Stewart Jackson; MP for Peterborough (2005–2017) 
William Jackson; MP for Leeds (1880–1885) and Leeds North (1885–1902)
Sir Archibald James; MP for Wellingborough (1931–1945)
David James; MP for Brighton Kemptown (1959–1964) and North Dorset (1970–1979)
Margot James; MP for Stourbridge (2010–2019; 2019)
Tim Janman; MP for Thurrock (1987–1992)
Sir Weston Jarvis; MP for King's Lynn (1886–1892)
Sajid Javid; MP for Bromsgrove (2010–present)
Ranil Jayawardena; MP for North East Hampshire (2015–present)
Arthur Frederick Jeffreys; MP for Basingstoke (1887–1906)
George Jeffreys; MP for Petersfield (1941–1951)
William Jellett; MP for Dublin University (1919–1922)
Sir Bernard Jenkin; MP for Colchester North (1992–1997), North Essex (1997–2010) and Harwich and North Essex (2010–present)
Patrick Jenkin; MP for Wanstead and Woodford (1964–1987)
Robert Jenkins; MP for Dulwich (1951–1964)
Mark Jenkinson; MP for Workington (2019–present)
Andrea Jenkyns; MP for Morley and Outwood (2015–present)
John Jennings; MP for Burton (1955–1974)
Sir Roland Jennings; MP for Sedgefield (1931–1935) and Sheffield Hallam (1939–1959)
Robert Jenrick; MP for Newark (2014–present)
Alfred Jephcott; MP for Birmingham Yardley (1918–1929)
Toby Jessel; MP for Twickenham (1970–1997)
Sir Neville Jodrell; MP for Mid Norfolk (1918) and King's Lynn (1918–1923)
Dudley Joel; MP for Dudley (1931–1941)
Boris Johnson; MP for Henley (2001–2008) and Uxbridge and South Ruislip (2015–present)
Caroline Johnson; MP for Sleaford and North Hykeham (2016–present)
Donald Johnson; MP for Carlisle (1955–1964)
Eric Johnson; MP for Manchester Blackley (1951–1964) 
Gareth Johnson; MP for Dartford (2010–present)
Jo Johnson; MP for Orpington (2010–2019) 
William Gillilan Johnson; MP for Belfast (1841–1842) 
Sir Geoffrey Johnson-Smith; MP for Holborn and St Pancras South (1959–1964), East Grinstead (1965–1983) and Wealden (1983–2001)
David Johnston; MP for Wantage (2019–present)
William Johnston; MP for Belfast South (1885–1902) 
Hedworth Jolliffe, 2nd Baronet; MP for Wells (1855–1868)
Hylton Jolliffe, 3rd Baronet; MP for Wells (1895–1899)
Sir William Jolliffe, 1st Baronet; MP for Petersfield (1837–1838; 1841–1866)
William Sydney Hylton Jolliffe; MP for Petersfield (1874–1880)
Andrew Jones; MP for Harrogate and Knaresborough (2010–present)
Arthur Jones; MP for Northamptonshire South (1962–1974) and Daventry (1974–1979)
Aubrey Jones; MP for Birmingham Hall Green (1950–1965)
David Jones; MP for Clwyd West (2005–present)
Fay Jones; MP for Brecon and Radnorshire (2019–present)
Gwilym Jones; MP for Cardiff North (1983–1997) 
Marcus Jones; MP for Nuneaton (2010–present)
Robert Jones; MP for West Hertfordshire (1983–1997) 
Michael Jopling; MP for Westmorland (1964–1983) and Westmorland and Lonsdale (1983–1997)
Sir Keith Joseph, 2nd Baronet; MP for Leeds North East (1956–1987) 
Sir Lancelot Joynson-Hicks, 1st Baronet; MP for Chichester (1942–1958) 
Sir William Joynson-Hicks, 1st Baronet; MP for Manchester North West (1908–1910), Brentford (1911–1918) and Twickenham (1918–1929)
Simon Jupp; MP for East Devon (2019–present)

K
Sir Donald Kaberry, 1st Baronet; MP for Leeds North West (1950–1983)
Arthur MacMurrough Kavanagh; MP for County Wexford (1866–1868) and Carlow County (1868–1880)
Thomas Kavanagh; MP for Carlow County (1835; 1835–1837)
Daniel Kawczynski; MP for Shrewsbury and Atcham (2005–present)
Alicia Kearns; MP for Rutland and Melton (2019–present)
John Hodson Kearsley; MP for Wigan (1835–1837)
Gillian Keegan; MP for Chichester (2017–present)
Sir Edward Keeling; MP for Twickenham (1935–1954)
Dame Elaine Kellett-Bowman; MP for Lancaster (1970–1997)
Sir Frederic Kelley; MP for Rotherham (1918–1923)
Sir Fitzroy Kelly; MP for Ipswich (1835; 1838–1841), Cambridge (1843–1847), Harwich (1852) and East Suffolk (1852–1866)
Sir John Kennaway, 3rd Baronet; MP for East Devon (1870–1885) and Honiton (1885–1910)
Seema Kennedy; MP for South Ribble (2015–2019)
William Keown-Boyd; MP for Downpatrick (1867–1874)
David Guardi Ker; MP for Downpatrick (1835–1841)
David Stewart Ker; MP for Downpatrick (1841–1847; 1859–1867) and Down (1852–1857)
Richard Ker; MP for Down (1884–1885) and East Down (1885–1890)
John Kerans; MP for The Hartlepools (1959–1964)
Henry Kerby; MP for Arundel and Shoreham (1954–1971) 
Sir Hamilton Kerr, 1st Baronet; MP for Oldham (1931–1945) and Cambridge (1950–1966)
Michael Kerr, 13th Marquess of Lothian; MP for Berwick and East Lothian (1974), Edinburgh South (1979–1987) and Devizes (1992–2010)
Stephen Kerr; MP for Stirling (2017–present)
Sir Anthony Kershaw; MP for Stroud (1955–1987)
Robert Key; MP for Salisbury (1983–2010)
Roger Keys; MP for Portsmouth North (1934–1943)
Marcus Kimball; MP for Gainsborough (1956–1983)
Evelyn King; MP for South Dorset (1964–1979)
John Gilbert King; MP for King's County (1865–1868)
Roger King; MP for Birmingham Northfield (1983–1992)
Tom King; MP for Bridgwater (1970–2001)
William Kingsmill; MP for Yeovil (1945–1951)
Sir Clement Kinloch-Cooke, 1st Baronet; MP for Devonport (1910–1923) and Cardiff East (1924–1929)
Joseph Kinsey; MP for Birmingham Perry Barr (1970–1974)
Peter Michael Kirk
Julie Kirkbride; MP for Bromsgrove (1997–2010)
Timothy Kirkhope; MP for Leeds North East (1987–1997)
William Kirkpatrick
Roger Knapman; MP for Stroud (1987–1997)
Michael Knatchbull, 5th Baron Brabourne
Herbert Knatchbull-Hugessen
Angela Knight; MP for Erewash (1992–1997)
Frederick Knight
Sir Greg Knight; MP for Derby North (1983–1997) and East Yorkshire (2001–present)
Dame Jill Knight; MP for Birmingham Edgbaston (1966–1997)
Julian Knight; MP for Solihull (2015–present)
Michael Knowles
Sir Alfred Knox; MP for Wycombe (1924–1945)
Sir David Knox; MP for Leek (1970–1983) and Staffordshire Moorlands (1983–1997)
Danny Kruger; MP for Devizes (2019–present)
Kwasi Kwarteng; MP for Spelthorne (2010–present)
George Kynoch; MP for Aston Manor (1886–1891)
George Kynoch; MP for Kincardine and Deeside (1992–1997)

L
Dame Eleanor Laing; MP for Epping Forest (1997–present)
John Laird; MP for Birkenhead (1861–1874)
Jacqui Lait; MP for Hastings and Rye (1992–1997) and Beckenham (1997–2010)
Sir Joseph Lamb; MP for Stone (1922–1945)
Anthony Lambton, The Lord Lambton; MP for Berwick-upon-Tweed (1951–1973)
John Lamont; MP for Berwickshire, Roxburgh and Selkirk (2017–present)
Norman Lamont; MP for Kingston-upon-Thames (1972–1997)
Claude Lancaster; MP for Fylde (1938–1950) and South Fylde (1950–1970)
Mark Lancaster; MP for North East Milton Keynes (2005–2010) and Milton Keynes North (2010–2019)
David Lane; MP for Cambridge (1967–1976)
George Lane-Fox; MP for Barkston Ash (1906–1931)
Ian Lang; MP for Galloway (1979–1983) and Galloway and Upper Nithsdale (1983–1997)
John Langford-Holt
Andrew Lansley; MP for South Cambridgeshire (1997–2015)
Sir Charles Lanyon
Robert Largan; MP for High Peak (2019–present)
Joseph Larmor
Michael Latham
Pauline Latham; MP for Mid Derbyshire (2010–present)
John Laurie; MP for Barnstaple (1854–1855; 1857–1859)
Sir Alfred Law; MP for Rochdale (1918–1922) and High Peak (1929–1939)
Bonar Law; MP for Glasgow Blackfriars and Hutchesontown (1900–1906), Dulwich (1906–1910), Bootle (1911–1918) and Glasgow Central (1918–1923) 
Richard Law; MP for Kingston upon Hull South West (1931–1945), Kensington South (1945–1950) and Haltemprice (1950–1954) 
Geoffrey Lawler; MP for Bradford North (1983–1987)
Sir Ivan Lawrence; MP for Burton (1974–1997)
Nigel Lawson; MP for Blaby (1974–1992)
Dame Andrea Leadsom; MP for South Northamptonshire (2010–present)
Edwin Leather; MP for North Somerset (1950–1964)
Tony Leavey; MP for Heywood and Royton (1955–1964)
Gilmour Leburn; MP for Kinross and West Perthshire (1955–1963)
John Lee; MP for Nelson and Colne (1979–1983) and Pendle (1983–1992)
Phillip Lee; MP for Bracknell (2010–2019)
Sir Elliott Lees, 1st Baronet
John Lees-Jones
Anthony Lefroy
Jeremy Lefroy; MP for Stafford (2010–2019)
Thomas Langlois Lefroy
Nicholas Leader; MP for Cork County (1861–1868)
Barry Legg
William Legge, 5th Viscount Lewisham
William Legge, 6th Viscount Lewisham
William Legge, 7th Viscount Lewisham
Harry Legge-Bourke
George Legh
Peter Legh; MP for Petersfield (1951–1960)
Sir Edward Leigh; MP for Gainsborough and Horncastle (1983–1997) and Gainsborough (1997–present)
Egerton Leigh
Sir Spencer Le Marchant; MP for High Peak (1970–1983)
Lord Henry Lennox; MP for Chichester (1846–1885)
Lord William Lennox; MP for King's Lynn (1834–1835)
Alan Lennox-Boyd
Mark Lennox-Boyd
Sir John Leslie, 1st Baronet
Sir Jim Lester; MP for Beeston (1974–1983) and Broxtowe (1983–1997)
Sir Oliver Letwin; MP for West Dorset (1997–2019)
John Orrell Lever; MP for Galway Borough (1859–1865)
Ian Levy; MP for Blyth Valley (2019–present)
Thomas Levy; MP for Elland (1931–1945)
Andrew Lewer; MP for Northampton South (2017–present)
Brandon Lewis; MP for Great Yarmouth (2010–present)
Julian Lewis; MP for New Forest East (1997–2020; 2020–present)
Sir Kenneth Lewis; MP for Rutland and Stamford (1959–1983) and Stamford and Spalding (1983–1987)
Ian Liddell-Grainger
Sir David Lidington; MP for Aylesbury (1992–2019)
Sir David Lightbown; MP for South East Staffordshire (1983–1995)
Frank Lilley
Peter Lilley; MP for St Albans (1983–1997) and Hitchin and Harpenden (1997–2017)
David Lindsay, 27th Earl of Crawford
James Louis Lindsay
Sir Martin Lindsay, 1st Baronet
Noel Ker Lindsay
Robert Lindsay
Hugh Linstead
John Litchfield; MP for Chelsea (1959–1966)
John Jestyn Llewellin, 1st Baron Llewellin
David Llewellyn
Evan Henry Llewellyn
Geoffrey William Lloyd
George Lloyd, 1st Baron Lloyd
Sir Ian Lloyd
Sir Peter Lloyd
Selwyn Lloyd; MP for Wirral (1945–1971)
Godfrey Locker-Lampson
Oliver Locker-Lampson
John Cutts Lockwood
Chris Loder; MP for West Dorset (2019–present)
John Loder, 2nd Baron Wakehurst
Mark Logan; MP for Bolton North East (2019–present)
Richard Long, 3rd Viscount Long
Walter Long, 1st Viscount Long
Charles Longbottom
Gilbert Longden
Marco Longhi; MP for Dudley North (2019–present)
Henry Longhurst
Richard Longfield; MP for Cork County (1835–1837)
Robert Longfield; MP for Mallow (1859–1865)
Julia Lopez; MP for Hornchurch and Upminster (2017–present)
Jack Lopresti; MP for Filton and Bradley Stoke (2010–present)
Jonathan Lord; MP for Woking (2010–present)
Sir Michael Lord; MP for Suffolk Central (1983–1997) and Central Suffolk and North Ipswich (1997–2010)
Tim Loughton; MP for East Worthing and Shoreham (1997–present)
Sir John Loveridge; MP for Hornchurch (1970–1974) and Upminster (1974–1983)
Walter Loveys; MP for Chichester (1958–1969)
Toby Low, 1st Baron Aldington
Sir Francis Lowe, 1st Baronet
Henry Thomas Lowry-Corry
Sir Cecil Lowther
Christopher William Lowther
Claude Lowther
Henry Lowther, 3rd Earl of Lonsdale
Henry Lowther
James Lowther; MP for York (1865–1880), North Lincolnshire (1881–1885) and Isle of Thanet (1888–1904)
James Lowther, 1st Viscount Ullswater
William Lowther
Arthur Loyd; MP for Abingdon (1921–1923)
Robert Loyd-Lindsay, 1st Baron Wantage
Sir Jocelyn Lucas, 4th Baronet; MP for Portsmouth South (1939–1966)
Percy Lucas; MP for Brentford and Chiswick (1950–1959)
Hugh Lucas-Tooth
Richard Luce
Richard Luce
Sir Peter Luff; MP for Worcester (1992–1997) and Mid Worcestershire (1997–2015)
Sir Leonard Lyle, 1st Baronet; MP for Stratford West Ham (1918–1922), Epping (1923–1924) and Bournemouth (1940–1945)
Karen Lumley; MP for Redditch (2010–2017)
Lawrence Lumley, 11th Earl of Scarbrough
Sir Nicholas Lyell
Frederick Lygon, 6th Earl Beauchamp
Hugh Lyons-Montgomery
Oliver Lyttelton, 1st Viscount Chandos
John Lyttelton, 9th Viscount Cobham

M
Sir Charles MacAndrew; MP for Kilmarnock (1924–1929), Glasgow Partick (1931–1935) and Bute and Northern Ayrshire (1935–1959)
Ian MacArthur; MP for Perth and East Perthshire (1959–1974)
Sir Peter Macdonald; MP for Isle of Wight (1924–1959)
Sir David Macfarlane; MP for Sutton and Cheam (1974–1992)
John MacGregor; MP for South Norfolk (1974–2001)
Andrew MacKay; MP for Birmingham Stechford (1977–1979), East Berkshire (1983–1997) and Bracknell (1997–2010)
William Forbes Mackenzie; MP for Peeblesshire (1837–1852) and Liverpool (1852–1853)
Craig Mackinlay; MP for South Thanet (2015–present)
Cherilyn Mackrory; MP for Truro and Falmouth (2019–present)
John Maclay, 1st Viscount Muirshiel
David Maclean; MP for Penrith and The Border (1983–2010)
Sir Fitzroy Maclean, 1st Baronet; MP for Lancaster (1941–1959) and Bute and Northern Ayrshire (1959–1974)
Rachel Maclean; MP for Redditch (2017–present)
Billy McLean; MP for Inverness (1954–1964)
Iain Macleod; MP for Enfield West (1950–1970)
Sir John MacLeod; MP for Ross and Cromarty (1951–1964)
Mary Macleod; MP for Brentford and Isleworth Brentford and Isleworth (UK Parliament constituency) (2010-2015)
Sir Donald Macmaster, 1st Baronet; MP for Chertsey (1910–1922)
Harold Macmillan; MP for Stockton-on-Tees (1924–1929; 1931–1945) and Bromley (1945–1964)
Maurice Macmillan, 1st Viscount Macmillan of Ovenden; MP for Halifax (1955–1964), Farnham (1966–1983) and South West Surrey (1983–1984)
Edward Macnaghten, Baron Macnaghten
Niall Macpherson, 1st Baron Drumalbyn
Frederick Alexander Macquisten; MP for Glasgow Springburn (1918–1922) and Argyllshire (1924–1940)
Sir Mark MacTaggart-Stewart, 1st Baronet; MP for Wigtown Burghs (1874–1880; 1880) and Kirkcudbrightshire (1885–1906; 1910)
Martin Maddan
Dodgson Hamilton Madden
Sir David Madel; MP for South Bedfordshire (1970–1983) and South West Bedfordshire (1983–2001)
Anne Main; MP for St Albans (2005–2019)
Sir Adam Maitland; MP for Faversham (1928–1945)
Lady Olga Maitland
Patrick Maitland, 17th Earl of Lauderdale
John Major; MP for Huntingdonshire (1979–1983) and Huntingdon (1983–2001)
Alan Mak; MP for Havant (2015–present)
Sir Ian Malcolm; MP for Stowmarket (1895–1906), Croydon (1910–1918) and Croydon South (1918–1919)
Humfrey Malins
Gerry Malone; MP for Aberdeen South (1983–1987) and Winchester (1992–1997)
Kit Malthouse; MP for North West Hampshire (2015–present)
Anthony Mangnall; MP for Totnes (2019–present)
Scott Mann; MP for North Cornwall (2015–present)
Lord John Manners; MP for Newark (1841–1847), Colchester (1850–1857), Leicestershire North (1857–1885) and Melton (1885–1888)
John Manners-Sutton; MP for Cambridge (1839–1840; 1841–1847)
John Manners-Sutton; MP for Newark (1847–1857)
Reginald Manningham-Buller, 1st Viscount Dilhorne
Keith Mans
John Maples
David Margesson, 1st Viscount Margesson
Edward Marjoribanks; MP for Eastbourne (1929–1932)
Frank Markham
Paul Marland
Antony Marlow
Anthony Marlowe
Ernest Marples
Douglas Marshall
John Leslie Marshall
Sir Michael Marshall; MP for Arundel (1974–1997)
Edward Marshall-Hall
Julie Marson; MP for Hertford and Stortford (2019–present)
Sir Neil Marten; MP for Banbury (1959–1983)
Glyn Mason, 2nd Baron Blackford
William Massey-Mainwaring
Paul Masterton; MP for East Renfrewshire (2017–2019)
David Martin; MP for Portsmouth South (1987–1997)
Michael Mates; MP for Petersfield (1974–1983) and East Hampshire (1983–2010)
Tania Mathias; MP for Twickenham (2015–2017)
Carol Mather
George Benvenuto Mathew
Robert Mathew
Gordon Matthews; MP for Meriden (1959–1964)
Angus Maude
Francis Maude; MP for North Warwickshire (1983–1992) and Horsham (1997–2015)
Reginald Maudling; MP for Barnet (1950–1974) and Chipping Barnet (1974–1979)
Ray Mawby; MP for Totnes (1955–1983)
Brian Mawhinney; MP for Peterborough (1979–1997) and North West Cambridgeshire (1997–2005)
David Maxwell Fyfe, 1st Earl of Kilmuir
Herbert Maxwell
Somerset Arthur Maxwell
Sir Robin Maxwell-Hyslop; MP for Tiverton (1960–1992)
Theresa May; MP for Maidenhead (1997–present)
Lynch Maydon; MP for Wells (1951–1970)
Jerome Mayhew; MP for Broadland (2019–present)
Sir Patrick Mayhew; MP for Tunbridge Wells (1974–1997)
Paul Maynard; MP for Blackpool North and Cleveleys (2010–present)
Stephen McAdden
Sir Duncan McCallum; MP for Argyllshire (1940–1950) and Argyll (1950–1958)
Jason McCartney; MP for Colne Valley (2010–2017; 2019–present)
Karl McCartney; MP for Lincoln (2010–2017; 2019–present)
John McClintock; MP for County Louth (1857–1859)
William McClintock-Bunbury; MP for Carlow County (1846–1852; 1853–1862)
Malcolm McCorquodale, 1st Baron McCorquodale
Robert McCrindle
Anna McCurley
Angus McDonnell
James McGarel-Hogg, 1st Baron Magheramorne
Anne McIntosh
Martin McLaren
Billy McLean; MP for Inverness (1954–1964)
Sir Patrick McLoughlin; MP for West Derbyshire (1986–2010) and Derbyshire Dales (2010–2019)
Michael McNair-Wilson
Patrick McNair-Wilson
Ronald McNeill, 1st Baron Cushendun
Stephen McPartland; MP for Stevenage (2010–present)
Albert McQuarrie
Esther McVey; MP for Wirral West (2010–2015) and Tatton (2017–present)
Frank Medlicott
David Mellor; MP for Putney (1979–1997)
Sir John Mellor, 2nd Baronet; MP for Tamworth (1935–1945) and Sutton Coldfield (1945–1955)
Louise Mensch; MP for Corby (2010–2012)
Mark Menzies; MP for Fylde (2010–present)
Johnny Mercer; MP for Plymouth Moor View (2015–present)
Patrick Mercer; MP for Newark (2001–2013)
Piers Merchant; MP for Newcastle upon Tyne Central (1983–1987) and Beckenham (1992–1997)
Frank Merriman, 1st Baron Merriman
Huw Merriman; MP for Bexhill and Battle (2015–present)
Stephen Metcalfe; MP for South Basildon and East Thurrock (2010–present)
Hedworth Meux
Anthony Meyer
Frank Cecil Meyer
Hugo Meynell-Ingram; MP for West Staffordshire (1868–1871)
Francis Mildmay; MP for Totnes (1912–1922)
Charles William Miles; MP for Malmesbury (1882–1885)
John Miles; MP for Bristol (1868)
Philip John Miles; MP for Bristol (1835–1837)
Sir Philip Miles, 2nd Baronet; MP for East Somerset (1878–1885)
Philip William Skinner Miles; MP for Bristol (1837–1852)
Sir William Miles, 1st Baronet; MP for East Somerset (1834–1865)
Robin Millar; MP for Aberconwy (2019–present)
Hal Miller; MP for Bromsgrove and Redditch (1974–1983) and Bromsgrove (1983–1992)
Maria Miller; MP for Basingstoke (2005–present)
Stephen Milligan; MP for Eastleigh (1992–1994)
William Milligan, Lord Milligan
Amanda Milling; MP for Cannock Chase (2015–present)
Sir Frederick Mills, 1st Baronet
Iain Mills
Nigel Mills; MP for Amber Valley (2010–present)
Sir Peter Mills; MP for Torrington (1964–1974), West Devon (1974–1983) and Torridge and West Devon (1983–1987)
Richard Monckton Milnes, 1st Baron Houghton
Anne Milton; MP for Guildford (2005–2019)
Norman Miscampbell
Andrew Mitchell; MP for Gedling (1987–1997) and Sutton Coldfield (2001–present)
Colin Mitchell; MP for Aberdeenshire West (1970–1974)
Sir David Mitchell; MP for Basingstoke (1964–1983) and North West Hampshire (1983–1997)
William Mitchell-Thomson, 1st Baron Selsdon
Sir Roger Moate; MP for Faversham (1970–1997)
Gagan Mohindra; MP for South West Hertfordshire (2019–present)
Leonard Greenham Star Molloy
Hugh Molson; MP for Doncaster (1931–1935) and High Peak (1939–1961)
Francis Monckton
Walter Monckton, 1st Viscount Monckton of Brenchley
Henry Mond, 2nd Baron Melchett
Ernle Money; MP for Ipswich (1970–1974)
Constance Monks; MP for Chorley (1970–1974)
Hector Monro, Baron Monro of Langholm
Lord Robert Montagu
Victor Montagu
Lord William Montagu-Douglas-Scott
Walter Montagu-Douglas-Scott, 8th Duke of Buccleuch
Anderson Montague-Barlow
Fergus Montgomery
Sir William Montgomery-Cuninghame, 9th Baronet; MP for Ayr Burghs (1874–1880)
Damien Moore; MP for Southport (2017–present)
John Moore, Baron Moore of Lower Marsh
Newton Moore
Robbie Moore; MP for Keighley (2019–present)
Stephen Moore
Sir Thomas Moore, 1st Baronet
John Moore-Brabazon, 1st Baron Brabazon of Tara
Penny Mordaunt; MP for Portsmouth North (2010–present)
Jasper More
Adrian Moreing
Algernon Moreing
Frederick Courtenay Morgan
Geraint Morgan
Nicky Morgan; MP for Loughborough (2010–2019)
Morgan Morgan-Giles
Anne Marie Morris; MP for Newton Abbot (2010–2017; 2017–present)
David Morris; MP for Morecambe and Lunesdale (2010–present)
James Morris; MP for Halesowen and Rowley Regis (2010–present)
Martin Morris; MP for Galway Borough (1900–1901)
Michael Morris; MP for Galway Borough (1866–1867)
Michael Morris, Baron Naseby
Sir Charles Morrison; MP for Devizes (1964–1992)
Hugh Morrison; MP for Wilton (1918) and Salisbury (1918–1923; 1924–1931)
John Morrison, 1st Baron Margadale
Sir Peter Morrison; MP for City of Chester (1974–1992)
William Morrison; MP for Cirencester and Tewkesbury (1929–1951)
Sir Clive Morrison-Bell, 1st Baronet; MP for Honiton (1910–1931)
Joy Morrissey; MP for Beaconsfield (2019–present)
Jill Mortimer; MP for Hartlepool (2021–present)
Wendy Morton; MP for Aldridge-Brownhills (2015–present)
Sir Oswald Mosley, 6th Baronet; MP for Harrow (1918–1922)
Stephen Mosley; MP for City of Chester (2010-2015)
Malcolm Moss; MP for North East Cambridgeshire (1987–2010)
Charles Mott-Radclyffe
Sir William Mount, 1st Baronet
William George Mount
Colin Moynihan
David Mudd
Anthony Muirhead
Henry Mulholland, 2nd Baron Dunleath
Kieran Mullan; MP for Crewe and Nantwich (2019–present)
Holly Mumby-Croft; MP for Scunthorpe (2019–present)
David Mundell; MP for Dumfriesshire, Clydesdale and Tweeddale (2005–present)
Christopher Murphy
Andrew Murray, 1st Viscount Dunedin
Sir George Murray; MP for Perthshire (1834–1835)
Sheryll Murray; MP for South East Cornwall (2010–present)
William Murray, 9th Viscount Stormont; MP for Norwich (1834–1837) and Perthshire (1837–1840)
Hylton Murray-Philipson
Andrew Murrison
Oscar Murton, Baron Murton of Lindisfarne
William Myers; MP for Winchester (1892–1906)
David Myles

N
Sir Gerald Nabarro; MP for Kidderminster (1950–1964) and South Worcestershire (1966–1973)
Ronald Nall-Cain; MP for Liverpool Wavertree (1931–1934)
Sir Joseph Napier, 1st Baronet; MP for Dublin University (1848–1858)
Sir Gerry Neale; MP for North Cornwall (1979–1992)
Airey Neave; MP for Abingdon (1953–1979)
Richard Needham, 6th Earl of Kilmorey; MP for Chippenham (1979–1983) and North Wiltshire (1983–1997)
Sir Bob Neill; MP for Bromley and Chislehurst (2006–present)
Anthony Nelson; MP for Chichester (1974–1997)
Robert Nesbitt; MP for Chislehurst (1922–1924)
Sir Michael Neubert; MP for Romford (1974–1997)
Basil Neven-Spence
Sir Robert Newman, 4th Baronet; MP for Exeter (1918–1927)
Brooks Newmark
George Newton, 1st Baron Eltisley
Sarah Newton; MP for Truro and Falmouth (2010–2019)
Tony Newton; MP for Braintree (1974–1997)
John Iltyd Nicholl; MP for Cardiff (1834–1852)
Sir Harmar Nicholls, 1st Baronet; MP for Peterborough (1950–1974)
Patrick Nicholls
David Nicholson; MP for Taunton (1987–1997)
Emma Nicholson; MP for Torridge and West Devon (1987–1995)
Sir Godfrey Nicholson, 1st Baronet; MP for Morpeth (1931–1935) and Farnham (1937–1966)
John Sanctuary Nicholson
Lia Nici; MP for Great Grimsby (2019–present)
Nigel Nicolson; MP for Bournemouth East and Christchurch (1952–1959)
Basil Nield
Herbert Nield
Robert Nisbet-Hamilton; MP for Ipswich (1835) and North Lincolnshire (1837–1857)
Allan Noble
Michael Noble, Baron Glenkinglas
Gerard Noel
Caroline Nokes; MP for Romsey and Southampton North (2010–2019; 2019–present)
Archie Norman
Jesse Norman; MP for Hereford and South Herefordshire (2010–present)
Wilfrid Normand, Baron Normand
Tom Normanton; MP for Cheadle (1970–1987)
Steven Norris; MP for Oxford East (1983–1987) and Epping Forest (1988–1997)
Henry Northcote, 1st Baron Northcote
Sir Stafford Northcote, 8th Baronet
John Norton-Griffiths
Sir John Nott; MP for St Ives (1966–1983)
George Nugent, Baron Nugent of Guildford
William Nunn; MP for Whitehaven (1931–1935) and Newcastle upon Tyne West (1940–1945)
Anthony Nutting; MP for Melton (1945–1956)

O
Sir Hendrie Oakshott, 1st Baronet; MP for Bebington (1950–1964)
Sir Lucius O'Brien, 5th Baronet; MP for Clare (1847–1852)
Neil O'Brien; MP for Harborough (2017–present)
Sir Stephen O'Brien; MP for Eddisbury (1999–2015)
Sir Terence O'Connor; MP for Luton (1924–1929) and Nottingham Central (1930–1940)
George Odey; MP for Howdenshire (1947–1950) and Beverley (1950–1955)
William O'Donovan; MP for Mile End (1931–1935)
Matthew Offord; MP for Hendon (2010–present)
Gideon Oliphant-Murray; MP for Glasgow St Rollox (1918–1922)
Sir Charles Oman; MP for Oxford University (1919–1935)
Robert Torrens O'Neill; MP for Mid Antrim (1885–1910)
Cranley Onslow; MP for Woking (1964–1997)
Denzel Onslow; MP for Guildford (1874–1885)
Phillip Oppenheim; MP for Amber Valley (1983–1997)
Sally Oppenheim-Barnes; MP for Gloucester (1970–1987)
Guy Opperman; MP for Hexham (2010–present)
Arthur Walsh; MP for Radnorshire (1885–1892)
Thomas Ormiston; MP for Motherwell (1931–1935)
David Ormsby-Gore, 5th Baron Harlech
William Ormsby-Gore, 4th Baron Harlech
William Ormsby-Gore, 2nd Baron Harlech
Sir Archibald Orr-Ewing, 1st Baronet; MP for Dunbartonshire (1868–1892)
Charles Lindsay Orr-Ewing; MP for Ayr Burghs (1895–1904)
Sir Ian Orr-Ewing; MP for Weston-super-Mare (1934–1958)
Sir Ian Orr-Ewing, 1st Baronet; MP for Hendon North (1950–1970)
Sir John Osborn; MP for Sheffield Hallam (1959–1987)
Sir Cyril Osborne; MP for Louth, Lincolnshire (1945–1969)
George Osborne; MP for Tatton (2001–2017)
Sir Richard Ottaway; MP for Nottingham North (1983–1987) and Croydon South (1992–2015)
William Overend; MP for Pontefract (1859)
Idris Owen; MP for Stockport North (1970–1974)

P
Sir Graham Page; MP for Crosby (1953–1981)
Sir John Page; MP for Harrow West (1960–1987)
Richard Page; MP for Workington (1976–1979) and South West Hertfordshire (1979–2005)
Almeric Paget; MP for Cambridge (1910–1917)
Sir James Paice; MP for South East Cambridgeshire (1987–2015)
Sir John Pakington, 1st Baronet; MP for Droitwich (1837–1874)
Gerald Palmer; MP for Winchester (1935–1945)
Robert Palmer; MP for Berkshire (1834–1859)
Roundell Palmer, 1st Earl of Selborne
Sir Walter Palmer, 1st Baronet
Norman Pannell; MP for Liverpool Kirkdale (1955–1964)
Philip Oxenden Papillon; MP for Colchester (1859–1861)
Neil Parish; MP for Tiverton and Honiton (2010–2022)
Sir Gilbert Parker, 1st Baronet; MP for Gravesend (1900–1918)
Cecil Parkinson; MP for Enfield West (1970–1974), South Hertfordshire (1974–1983) and Hertsmere (1983–1992)
Matthew Parris; MP for West Derbyshire (1979–1986)
Ernest Partridge; MP for Battersea South (1951–1964)
Priti Patel; MP for Witham (2010–present)
Owen Paterson; MP for North Shropshire (1997–2021)
Sir Irvine Patnick; MP for Sheffield Hallam (1987–1997)
Chris Patten; MP for Bath (1979–1992)
John Patten; MP for Oxford (1979–1983) and Oxford West and Abingdon (1983–1997)
Sir Geoffrey Pattie; MP for Chertsey and Walton (1974–1997)
George Patton; MP for Bridgwater (1866)
Jim Pawsey; MP for Rugby (1979–1983) and Rugby and Kenilworth (1979–1983) (1983–1997)
Mark Pawsey; MP for Rugby (2010–present)
Elizabeth Peacock; MP for Batley and Spen (1983–1997)
Osbert Peake; MP for Leeds North (1929–1955) and Leeds North East (1955–1956)
Sir Charles Pearson; MP for Edinburgh and St Andrews Universities (1843–1910)
Francis Pearson
Herbert Pease, 1st Baron Daryngton
William Edwin Pease
Charles Peat
Sir John Peel; MP for Leicester South East (1957–1974)
Sir Robert Peel, 2nd Baronet; MP for Tamworth (1834–1846)
Andrew Pelling; MP for Croydon Central (2005–2007)
Lewis Pelly
Mike Penning; MP for Hemel Hempstead (2005–present)
Frederick Penny, 1st Viscount Marchwood
John Penrose; MP for Weston-super-Mare (2005–present)
Frederick Thomas Penton
Ian Percival
Andrew Percy; MP for Brigg and Goole (2010–present)
Eustace Percy, 1st Baron Percy of Newcastle
Lord Henry Percy
Lord Algernon Percy
Algernon Percy, 4th Lord Lovaine
Walter Frank Perkins; MP for New Forest (1910–1918) and New Forest and Christchurch (1918–1922)
Claire Perry; MP for Devizes (2010–2019)
Maurice Petherick
Sir Basil Peto, 1st Baronet; MP for Devizes (1910–1918) and Barnstaple (1920–1923; 1924–1928; 1928–1935)
Basil Arthur John Peto
Christopher Peto
Geoffrey Peto
John Peyton, Baron Peyton of Yeovil
Mabel Philipson; MP for Berwick-upon-Tweed (1923–1929)
Stephen Phillips; MP for Sleaford and North Hykeham (2010–2016)
Chris Philp
Charles Nicholas Paul Phipps
Charles Paul Phipps
John Lewis Phipps
Pickering Phipps; MP for Northampton (1874–1880) and South Northamptonshire (1881–1885)
Sir Eric Pickles; MP for Brentwood and Ongar (1992–2017)
Sir Kenneth Pickthorn, 1st Baronet
Charles Pierrepont, 4th Earl Manvers
Mervyn Pike
Richard Pilkington; MP for Newton (1899–1906)
Sir Richard Pilkington; MP for Widnes (1935–1945) and Poole (1951–1964)
Christopher Pincher; MP for Tamworth (2010–present)
Bonner Pink
James Pitman
Dame Edith Pitt; MP for Birmingham Edgbaston (1953–1966)
Jacob Pleydell-Bouverie, Viscount Folkestone; MP for Wilton (1892–1900)
William Pleydell-Bouverie, Viscount Folkestone; MP for South Wiltshire (1874–1885) and Enfield (1885–1889)
Leonard Plugge
John Pemberton Plumptre; MP for East Kent (1835–1852)
David Plunket; MP for Dublin University (1870–1895)
John William Plunkett, 17th Baron of Dunsany
Alexander Pollock; MP for Moray and Nairn (1979–1983) and Moray (1983–1987)
Ernest Pollock, 1st Viscount Hanworth
Vere Ponsonby, 9th Earl of Bessborough
Barry Porter; MP for Bebington and Ellesmere Port (1979–1983) and Wirral South (1983–1996)
David Porter; MP for Waveney (1987–1997)
Michael Portillo; MP for Enfield Southgate (1984–1997) and Kensington and Chelsea (1999–2005)
Percivall Pott; MP for Devizes (1955–1964)
John Potter; MP for Eccles (1931–1935)
Dan Poulter; MP for Central Suffolk and North Ipswich (2010–present)
Rebecca Pow; MP for Taunton Deane (2015–present)
Enoch Powell; MP for Wolverhampton South West (1950–1974)
William Powell; MP for Corby (1983–1997)
John Powley
Winthrop Mackworth Praed; MP for Great Yarmouth (1835–1837) and Aylesbury (1837–1839)
Reg Prentice; MP for Newham North East (1977–1979) and Daventry (1979–1987)
Victoria Prentis; MP for Banbury (2015–present)
Stanley Prescott
Sir William Prescott, 1st Baronet
Sir Walter Preston; MP for Mile End (1918–1923) and Cheltenham (1928–1937)
Ernest George Pretyman
Sir David Price; MP for Eastleigh (1955–1992)
Henry Price; MP for Lewisham West (1950–1964)
David Price-White
Henry Prinsep; MP for Harwich (1851)
David Prior; MP for North Norfolk (1997–2001)
Jim Prior; MP for Lowestoft (1959–1983) and Waveney (1983–1987)
Sir Otho Prior-Palmer; MP for Worthing (1945–1964)
Mark Prisk; MP for Hertford and Stortford (2001–2019)
Mark Pritchard; MP for The Wrekin (2005–present)
Henry Procter; MP for Accrington (1931–1945)
Harvey Proctor; MP for Basildon (1979–1983) and Billericay (1983–1987)
John Profumo; MP for Kettering (1940–1945) and Stratford-on-Avon (1950–1963)
Wilf Proudfoot; MP for Cleveland (1959–1964) and Brighouse and Spenborough (1970–1974)
Tom Pursglove; MP for Corby (2015–present)
Francis Pym; MP for Cambridgeshire (1961–1983) and South East Cambridgeshire (1983–1987)
Leslie Pym; MP for Monmouth (1939–1945)

Q
Sir Cuthbert Quilter, 2nd Baronet; MP for Sudbury (1910–1918)
Jeremy Quin; MP for Horsham (2015–present)
Will Quince; MP for Colchester (2015–present)
Joan Quennell; MP for Petersfield (1960–1974)

R
Dominic Raab; MP for Esher and Walton (2010–present)
Keith Raffan; MP for Delyn (1983–1992)
Henry Cecil Raikes; MP for City of Chester (1868–1880), Preston (1882) and Cambridge University (1882–1891)
Sir Victor Raikes; MP for South East Essex (1931–1945), Liverpool Wavertree (1945–1950) and Liverpool Garston (1950–1956)
Sir Timothy Raison; MP for Aylesbury (1970–1992)
Archibald Maule Ramsay; MP for Peebles and South Midlothian (1931–1945)
Simon Ramsay; MP for Forfarshire (1945–1950)
Herwald Ramsbotham, 1st Viscount Soulbury
Eugene Ramsden, 1st Baron Ramsden
George Taylor Ramsden; MP for Elland (1918–1922)
James Ramsden; MP for Harrogate (1954–1974)
John Randall; MP for Uxbridge (1997–2010) and Uxbridge and South Ruislip (2010–2015)
Tom Randall; MP for Gedling (2019–present)
Sir James Rankin, 1st Baronet
Arthur Ratcliffe; MP for Leek (1931–1935)
John Rathbone; MP for Bodmin (1935–1940)
Tim Rathbone; MP for Lewes (1974–1997)
Nathan Raw; MP for Liverpool Wavertree (1918–1922)
Peter Rawlinson; MP for Gedling (2019–present)
Ralph Rayner; MP for Totnes (1935–1955)
William Morris Reade; MP for Waterford City (1841–1842)
Mark Reckless; MP for Rochester and Strood (2010–2014)
Martin Redmayne, Baron Redmayne
Robert Redmond; MP for Bolton West (1970–1974)
Sir John Redwood; MP for Wokingham (1987–present)
Laurance Reed; MP for Bolton East (1970–1974)
Sir Stanley Reed; MP for Aylesbury (1938–1950)
Hugh Rees; MP for Swansea West (1959–1964)
Sir John Rees, 1st Baronet; MP for Montgomery (1906–1910) and Nottingham East (1912–1922)
Peter Rees; MP for Dover (1970–1974; 1983–1987) and Dover and Deal (1974–1983)
William Rees-Davies; MP for Isle of Thanet (1953–1974) and Thanet West (1974–1983)
Jacob Rees-Mogg; MP for North East Somerset (2010–present)
James Reid, Baron Reid
John Reith, 1st Baron Reith
Peter Remnant; MP for Wokingham (1950–1959)
David Renton, Baron Renton
Tim Renton, Baron Renton of Mount Harry
Sir Gervais Rentoul; MP for Lowestoft (1922–1934)
Sir James Reynolds, 1st Baronet
Robert Rhodes James
Charles Rhys, 8th Baron Dynevor
Brandon Rhys-Williams
Sir Frederick Rice; MP for Harwich (1924–1929)
Walter Rice, 7th Baron Dynevor
Nicola Richards; MP for West Bromwich East (2019–present)
Richard Richards; MP for Merioneth (1836–1852)
Rod Richards; MP for Clwyd North West (1992–1997)
Angela Richardson; MP for Guildford (2019–present)
Graham Riddick; MP for Colne Valley (1987–1997)
Matthew Ridley, 1st Viscount Ridley
Sir Matthew Ridley, 4th Baronet
Matthew White Ridley, 2nd Viscount Ridley
Nicholas Ridley, Baron Ridley of Liddesdale
Samuel Ridley
Sir Julian Ridsdale; MP for Harwich (1968–1992)
Sir Malcolm Rifkind; MP for Edinburgh Pentlands (1974–1997), Kensington and Chelsea (2005–2010) and Kensington (2010–2015)
Geoffrey Rippon; MP for Norwich South (1955–1964) and Hexham (1966–1987)
Charles Ritchie; MP for Tower Hamlets (1874–1885), St George (1885–1892) and Croydon (1895–1905)
Sir John Rivett-Carnac, 2nd Baronet; MP for Lymington (1852–1860)
Andrew Robathan; MP for Blaby (1992–2010) and South Leicestershire (2010–2015) 
Michael Roberts; MP for Cardiff North (1970–1974) and Cardiff North West (1974–1983) 
Sir Peter Roberts, 3rd Baronet; MP for Sheffield Ecclesall (1945–1950) and Sheffield Heeley (1950–1966) 
Rob Roberts; MP for Delyn (2019–2021)
Sir Wyn Roberts; MP for Conwy (1970–1997)
Sir David Robertson; MP for Streatham (1939–1950) and Caithness and Sutherland (1950–1959)
Sir Hugh Robertson; MP for Faversham and Mid Kent (2001–2015)
James Robertson; MP for Buteshire (1885–1891)
Laurence Robertson; MP for Tewkesbury (1997–present)
Raymond Robertson; MP for Aberdeen South (1992–1997)
Mary Robinson; MP for Cheadle (2015–present)
Roland Robinson, 1st Baron Martonmere
Thomas Herbert Robertson
Mark Robinson; MP for Newport West (1983–1987) and Somerton and Frome (1992–1997)
William Robson Brown
Rennell Rodd, 1st Baron Rennell
Sir John Rodgers, 1st Baronet
Dame Marion Roe; MP for Broxbourne (1983–2005)
Peter Rolt; MP for Greenwich (1852–1857)
William Roots; MP for Kensington South (1959–1968)
Sir Harold Roper; MP for North Cornwall (1950–1959)
Leonard Ropner
Andrew Rosindell; MP for Romford (2001–present)
Douglas Ross; MP for Moray (2017–present)
Sir Hugh Rossi; MP for Hornsey (1966–1983) and Hornsey and Wood Green (1983–1992)
James St Clair-Erskine, 3rd Earl of Rosslyn
Peter Rost; MP for South East Derbyshire (1970–1983) and Erewash (1983–1992)
Lionel Nathan de Rothschild
Henry John Rous
Andrew Rowe; MP for Mid Kent (1983–1997) and Faversham and Mid Kent (1997–2001)
Lee Rowley; MP for North East Derbyshire (2017–present)
Percy Royds
Anthony Royle, Baron Fanshawe of Richmond
Amber Rudd; MP for Hastings and Rye (2010–2019)
David Ruffley; MP for Bury St Edmunds (1997–2015)
Francis Rufford; MP for Worcester (1848–1852)
Edward Ruggles-Brise
Dame Angela Rumbold; MP for Mitcham and Morden (1982–1997)
Norah Runge; MP for Rotherhithe (1931–1935)
Dean Russell; MP for Watford (2019–present)
Francis Shirley Russell; MP for Cheltenham (1895–1900)
Ronald Russell
Stuart Russell; MP for Darwen (1935–1943)
Sir Hugo Rutherford, 2nd Baronet
Sir William Rutherford, 1st Baronet
David Rutley; MP for Macclesfield (2010–present)
Richard Ryder, Baron Ryder of Wensum
Robert Edward Dudley Ryder

S
Tom Sackville; MP for Bolton West (1983–1997)
Sir Tim Sainsbury; MP for Hove (1973–1997)
Sir Isidore Salmon; MP for Harrow (1924–1941)
Sir Edward Salt; MP for Birmingham Yardley (1931–1945)
Thomas Salt; MP for Stafford (1859–1865; 1869–1880; 1881–1885; 1886–1892)
Sir Arthur Salter; MP for Oxford University (1937–1950) and Ormskirk (1951–1953)
Gary Sambrook; MP for Birmingham Northfield (2019–present)
Arthur Samuel, 1st Baron Mancroft
Arthur Warren Samuels
Joseph Sandars; MP for Great Yarmouth (1848–1852)
Antoinette Sandbach; MP for Eddisbury (2015–2019)
Sir Robert Sanders, 1st Baronet; MP for Bridgwater (1910–1923) and Wells (1924–1929) 
Sir Frank Sanderson, 1st Baronet; MP for Darwen (1922–1923; 1924–1929), Ealing (1931–1945) and Ealing East (1945–1950)
Duncan Sandys; MP for Norwood (1935–1945) and Streatham (1950–1974)
Thomas Sandys; MP for Bootle (1885–1911)
Sir Philip Sassoon, 3rd Baronet
Edward James Saunderson
John Savile, 4th Viscount Pollington; MP for Pontefract (1835–1837; 1841–1847)
Selaine Saxby; MP for North Devon (2019–present)
Jonathan Sayeed; MP for Bristol East (1983–1992) and Mid Bedfordshire (1997–2005)
James Yorke Scarlett
Wentworth Schofield; MP for Rochdale (1951–1957)
George Sclater-Booth, 1st Baron Basing
Lee Scott
Sir Leslie Scott; MP for Liverpool Exchange (1910–1929)
Sir Nicholas Scott; MP for Paddington South (1966–1974) and Chelsea (1974–1997)
Robert Scott
John Scott, 9th Duke of Buccleuch
James Scott-Hopkins
Ronald Scott-Miller
Paul Scully; MP for Sutton and Cheam (2015–present)
Bob Seely; MP for Isle of Wight (2017–present)
Andrew Selous; MP for South West Bedfordshire (2001–present)
Henry Ker Seymer
Leslie Seymour
Grant Shapps; MP for Welwyn Hatfield (2005–present)
Alok Sharma; MP for Reading West (2010–present)
Richard Sharples; MP for Sutton and Cheam (1954–1972)
David Shaw
Sir Frederick Shaw, 3rd Baronet; MP for Dublin University (1834–1848)
Giles Shaw
Michael Shaw, Baron Shaw of Northstead
Alec Shelbrooke; MP for Elmet and Rothwell (2010–present)
William Shelton
Gillian Shephard; MP for South West Norfolk (1987–2005)
Colin Shepherd
Sir Richard Shepherd; MP for Aldridge-Brownhills (1979–1994; 1995–2015)
William Shepherd
Michael Shersby
John Joseph Shute
Colonel Sibthorp
Philip Sidney, 1st Baron De L'Isle and Dudley
Thomas Sidney
William Sidney, 1st Viscount De L'Isle
Frederick Silvester
Charles Simeons
David Simmonds; MP for Ruislip, Northwood and Pinner (2019–present)
Mark Simmonds
Jocelyn Simon, Baron Simon of Glaisdale
Keith Simpson; MP for Mid Norfolk (1997–2010) and Broadland (2010–2019)
Sir Roger Sims; MP for Chislehurst (1974–1997)
George Evelyn Sinclair
Sir George Sitwell, 4th Baronet
Trevor Skeet
Noel Skelton
Thomas Skewes-Cox
Chris Skidmore; MP for Kingswood (2010–present)
John Slater
Walter Dorling Smiles
Sir Bracewell Smith; MP for Dulwich (1932–1945)
Chloe Smith; MP for Norwich North (2009–present)
Dudley Smith
Edward Percy Smith
Eric Smith
Frederick Edwin Smith
Greg Smith; MP for Buckingham (2019–present)
Henry Smith; MP for Crawley (2010–present)
John Smith
Julian Smith; MP for Skipton and Ripon (2010–present)
Robert Workman Smith
Royston Smith; MP for Southampton Itchen (2015–present)
Tim Smith; MP for Ashfield (1977–1979) and Beaconsfield (1982–1997)
Lord Edward Smith-Stanley; MP for North Lancashire (1837–1844)
Alfred Waldron Smithers
Peter Smithers
Waldron Smithers
Sir John Smyth, 1st Baronet
George Smythe, 7th Viscount Strangford
William McNair Snadden
Christopher Soames; MP for Bedford (1950–1966)
Sir Nicholas Soames; MP for Crawley (1983–1997) and Mid Sussex (1997–2019; 2019)
Amanda Solloway; MP for Derby North (2015–2017; 2019–present)
Edward Arthur Somerset
Henry Somerset, 8th Duke of Beaufort
Donald Somervell, Baron Somervell of Harrow
Annesley Somerville
Joseph Somes; MP for Dartmouth (1844–1845)
Joseph Somes; MP for Kingston upon Hull (1859–1965)
Harold Soref
Thomas Henry Sutton Sotheron-Estcourt; MP for Devizes (1835–1844) and North Wiltshire (1844–1865)
Anna Soubry; MP for Broxtowe (2010–2019)
Sir Archibald Southby, 1st Baronet
Alexander Spearman
Louis Spears
Keith Speed
Sir Rupert Speir; MP for Hexham (1951–1966)
Antony Speller
Dame Caroline Spelman; MP for Meriden (1997–present)
Henry Spence
John Spence; MP for Sheffield Heeley (1970–1974), Thirsk and Malton (1974–1983) and Ryedale (1983–1986)
Ben Spencer; MP for Runnymede and Weybridge (2019–present)
Sir Derek Spencer; MP for Leicester South (1983–1987) and Brighton Pavilion (1992–1997)
Mark Spencer; MP for Sherwood (2010–present)
Lord Charles Spencer-Churchill; MP for Woodstock (1835–1837)
George Spencer-Churchill, Marquess of Blandford; MP for Woodstock (1834–1835; 1838–1840)
Walter Spencer-Stanhope; MP for West Riding of Yorkshire South (1872–1880)
Sir Patrick Spens; MP for Ashford (1933–1943) and Kensington South (1950–1959)
Sir James Spicer; MP for West Dorset (1974–1997)
Sir Michael Spicer; MP for South Worcestershire (1974–1997) and West Worcestershire (1997–2010)
Bob Spink; MP for Castle Point (1992–1997; 2001–2008)
Richard Spooner; MP for Birmingham (1844–1847) and North Warwickshire (1847–1864)
Richard Spring
Iain Sproat
Alexander Sprot
Robin Squire
Nick St Aubyn
Malcolm St Clair; MP for Bristol South East (1961–1963)
Norman St John-Stevas, Baron St John of Fawsley
Alexander Stafford; MP for Rother Valley (2019–present)
Augustus Stafford
Keith Stainton
Ivor Stanbrook
Edward Stanhope
Albert Stanley, 1st Baron Ashfield
Arthur Stanley
Edward Stanley, Lord Stanley
Frederick Stanley, 16th Earl of Derby
George Frederick Stanley
Henry Morton Stanley
John Stanley
Oliver Stanley; MP for Westmorland (1924–1945) and Bristol West (1945–1950)
Richard Stanley
Lewis Randle Starkey; MP for West Riding of Yorkshire South (1874–1880)
Arthur Steel-Maitland
Anthony Steen
Michael Stephen
Andrew Stephenson; MP for Pendle (2010–present)
Robert Stephenson; MP for Whitby (1847–1859)
Michael Stern
Andrew Steuart
Geoffrey Stevens
Lewis Stevens
Marshall Stevens
Martin Stevens
Jane Stevenson; MP for Wolverhampton North East (2019–present)
John Stevenson; MP for Carlisle (2010–present)
Harold Macdonald Steward
William Steward
Nairne Stewart Sandeman
Allan Stewart
Andy Stewart
Bob Stewart; MP for Beckenham (2010–present)
Iain Stewart; MP for Milton Keynes South (2010–present)
Sir Ian Stewart; MP for Hitchin (1974–1983) and North Hertfordshire (1983–1992)
Rory Stewart; MP for Penrith and The Border (2010–2019)
John Stewart-Murray, 8th Duke of Atholl; MP for Perthshire West (1910–1917)
Katharine Stewart-Murray, Duchess of Atholl; MP for Kinross and Western Perthshire (1923–1935; 1935–1937; 1937–1938)
Geoffrey Stewart-Smith
John Maxwell Stirling-Maxwell
Edwin Forsyth Stockton; MP for Manchester Exchange (1922–1923)
Anthony Stodart, Baron Stodart of Leaston
Malcolm Stoddart-Scott
John Heydon Stokes
John Benjamin Stone
Samuel Storey, Baron Buckton
Samuel Storey
William Henry Stott
John Stradling Thomas
Henry Strauss, 1st Baron Conesford
Gary Streeter
Gerald Strickland, 1st Baron Strickland
Mel Stride; MP for Central Devon (2010–present)
Arthur Stuart, 7th Viscount Stewart
Graham Stuart; MP for Beverley and Holderness (2005–present)
James Stuart, 1st Viscount Stuart of Findhorn
Charles Beilby Stuart-Wortley, 1st Baron Stuart of Wortley
Henry Studholme
Julian Sturdy; MP for York Outer (2010–present)
Thomas Stuttaford; MP for Norwich South (1970–1974)
Murray Sueter
Edward Sugden, 1st Baron St Leonards
Wilfrid Sugden
David Sumberg
Spencer Summers
Hugo Summerson; MP for Walthamstow (1987–1992)
Donald Sumner; MP for Orpington (1955–1962)
Rishi Sunak; MP for Richmond (Yorks) (2015–present)
James Sunderland; MP for Bracknell (2019–present)
Sir Harold Sutcliffe; MP for Royton (1931–1950) and Heywood and Royton (1950–1955)
John Sutcliffe; MP for Middlesbrough West (1970–1974)
Sir Desmond Swayne; MP for New Forest West (1997–present)
Walter Sweeney; MP for Vale of Glamorgan (1992–1997)
Sir Hugo Swire; MP for East Devon (2001–2019)
Sir Frederick Sykes; MP for Sheffield Hallam (1922–1928) and Nottingham Central (1940–1945)
John Sykes; MP for Scarborough (1992–1997)
Sir Mark Sykes, 6th Baronet; MP for Kingston upon Hull Central (1911–1919)
Sir Robert Syms; MP for Poole (1997–present)

T
John Ellis Talbot; MP for Brierley Hill (1959–1967)
Sir Reginald Talbot; MP for Stafford (1869–1874)
Walter Cecil Talbot; MP for County Waterford (1859–1865)
Thomas Tapling; MP for Harborough (1886–1891)
Sir Peter Tapsell; MP for Horncastle (1966–1983), East Lindsey (1983–1997) and Louth and Horncastle (1997–2015)
Mavis Tate; MP for Willesden West (1931–1935) and Frome (1935–1945)
Sir Charles Taylor; MP for Eastbourne (1935–1974)
Edwin Taylor; MP for Bolton East (1960–1964)
Frank Taylor; MP for Manchester Moss Side (1961–1974)
Hugh Taylor; MP for Tynemouth and North Shields (1852–1854; 1859–1861)
Ian Taylor; MP for Esher (1987–1997) and Esher and Walton (1997–2010)
John Taylor; MP for Solihull (1983–2005)
Robert Taylor; MP for Croydon North West (1970–1981)
Sir Teddy Taylor; MP for Glasgow Cathcart (1964–1979), Southend East (1980–1997) and Rochford and Southend East (1997–2005)
Thomas Edward Taylor; MP for Dublin County (1841–1883)
Sir William Taylor, 1st Baronet; MP for Bradford North (1950–1964)
Norman Tebbit; MP for Epping (1970–1974) and Chingford (1974–1992)
William Teeling
John Meredith Temple
Sir Owen Temple-Morris; MP for Cardiff East (1931–1942)
Peter Temple-Morris; MP for Leominster (1974–1997)
James Emerson Tennent
Stefan Terlezki
George Terrell; MP for Chippenham (1910–1922)
Margaret Thatcher; MP for Finchley (1959–1992)
Derek Thomas; MP for St Ives (2015–present)
Henry Thomas; MP for Kinsale (1835–1837; 1838–1841)
James Thomas, 1st Viscount Cilcennin
Leslie Thomas; MP for Canterbury (1953–1966) 
Peter Thomas, Baron Thomas of Gwydir
Sir Frederick Thomson, 1st Baronet
Ross Thomson; MP for Aberdeen South (2017–2019) 
Roy Thomason
Donald Thompson
Sir Kenneth Thompson, 1st Baronet
Patrick Thompson
Sir Richard Thompson, 1st Baronet
Neil Thorne
Peter Thorneycroft; MP for Stafford (1938–1945) and Monmouth (1945–1966)
Malcolm Thornton
Colin Thornton-Kemsley
Robert Thorp
John Henry Thorpe
Maggie Throup; MP for Erewash (2015–present)
Peter Thurnham
Henry Thynne, 7th Viscount Weymouth
Thomas Thynne, 8th Viscount Weymouth
Arthur Tiley
John Tilney
Edward Timpson; MP for Crewe and Nantwich (2008–2017) and Eddisbury (2019–present)
Alfred Todd; MP for Berwick-upon-Tweed (1929–1935)
Kelly Tolhurst; MP for Rochester and Strood (2015–present)
John Tollemache, 1st Baron Tollemache
Wilbraham Tollemache, 2nd Baron Tollemache
"Colonel" George Tomline
Justin Tomlinson; MP for North Swindon (2010–present)
Michael Tomlinson; MP for Mid Dorset and North Poole (2015–present)
Charles Tottenham; MP for New Ross (1856–1863)
Charles George Tottenham; MP for New Ross (1863–1868; 1878–1880)
George Touche
Sir Gordon Touche, 1st Baronet
John Townend
Max Townley
Cyril Townsend
Craig Tracey; MP for North Warwickshire (2015–present)
Richard Tracey
Anthony Trafford, Baron Trafford
David Tredinnick; MP for Bosworth (1987–2019)
Ronald Tree
Michael Trend
Anne-Marie Trevelyan; MP for Berwick-upon-Tweed (2015–present)
Horace Trevor-Cox
Peter Trew
David Trippier
Laura Trott; MP for Sevenoaks (2019–present)
Neville Trotter
Liz Truss; MP for South West Norfolk (2010–present)
George Tryon, 1st Baron Tryon
Tom Tugendhat; MP for Tonbridge and Malling (2015–present)
Richard Tufnell
Christopher Tugendhat, Baron Tugendhat
Tom Tugendhat; MP for Tonbridge and Malling (2015–present)
Andrew Turner; MP for Isle of Wight (2001–2017)
Colin William Carstairs Turner
Edward Turnour, 6th Earl Winterton
Robin Turton, Baron Tranmire
Ian Twinn
Andrew Tyrie; MP for Chichester (1997–2017)

U
David Urquhart; MP for Stafford (1847–1852)

V
Ed Vaizey; MP for Wantage (2005–2019; 2019)
Charles James Valentine; MP for Cockermouth (1885–1886)
Crofton Moore Vandeleur; MP for Clare (1859–1874)
George Henry Vansittart; MP for Berkshire (1852–1859)
Sir William van Straubenzee; MP for Wokingham (1959–1987)
Shailesh Vara; MP for North West Cambridgeshire (2005–present)
Sir Gerard Vaughan; MP for Reading (1970–1974), Reading South (1974–1983) and Reading East (1983–1997)
John Vaughan-Morgan; MP for Reigate (1950–1970)
Francis Venables-Vernon-Harcourt; MP for Isle of Wight (1852–1857)
Richard Verney; MP for Rugby (1895–1900)
Leicester Viney Vernon; MP for Chatham (1853–1857) and Berkshire (1859–1860)
Douglas Vickers; MP for Sheffield Hallam (1918–1922)
Dame Joan Vickers; MP for Plymouth Devonport (1955–1974)
Martin Vickers; MP for Cleethorpes (2010–present)
Matt Vickers; MP for Stockton South (2019–present)
Stanley Vickers; MP for Wallingford (1868–1872)
Sir Peter Viggers; MP for Gosport (1974–2010)
Edward Villiers, Lord Hyde; MP for Brecon (1869–1870)
Theresa Villiers; MP for Chipping Barnet (2005–present)
Sir Howard Vincent; MP for Sheffield Central (1885–1908)
Sir Edgar Vincent; MP for Exeter (1899–1906)
Dennis Vosper; MP for Runcorn (1950–1964)
Sir Richard Vyvyan, 8th Baronet; MP for Bristol (1834–1837) and Helston (1841–1857)

W
David Waddington; MP for Maldon (1847–1852) and Harwich (1852–1856)
David Waddington; MP for Nelson and Colne (1968–1974), Clitheroe (1979–1983) and Ribble Valley (1983–1990)
Edward Wakefield; MP for West Derbyshire (1950–1962)
Sir Wavell Wakefield; MP for Swindon (1935–1945) and St Marylebone (1945–1963)
Christian Wakeford; MP for Bury South (2019–2022)
John Wakeham; MP for Maldon (1974–1983) and South Colchester and Maldon (1983–1992)
William Waldegrave; MP for Bristol West (1979–1997)
George Walden; MP for Buckingham (1983–1997)
David Walder; MP for High Peak (1961–1966) and Clitheroe (1970–1978)
Bill Walker; MP for Perth and East Perthshire (1979–1983) and North Tayside (1983–1997)
Sir Charles Walker; MP for Broxbourne (2005–present)
Peter Walker; MP for Worcester (1961–1992)
Robin Walker; MP for Worcester (2010–present)
William Walker, 1st Baron Wavertree
Derek Walker-Smith
Sir Patrick Wall; MP for Haltemprice (1954–1983) and Beverley (1983–1987)
Ben Wallace; MP for Lancaster and Wyre (2005–2010) and Wyre and Preston North (2010–present)
Euan Wallace; MP for Rugby (1922–1923) and Hornsey (1924–1941) 
Gary Waller; MP for Brighouse and Spenborough (1979–1983) and Keighley (1983–1997)
Jamie Wallis; MP for Bridgend (2019–present)
Gerard Wallop, 9th Earl of Portsmouth
Frederick Walpole; MP for Norfolk North (1868–1876)
Sir William Walrond, 1st Baronet; MP for Devon East (1880–1885) and Tiverton (1885–1905)
William Walrond; MP for Tiverton (1906–1915)
John Edward Walsh; MP for Dublin University (1866–1867)
Robert Walter; MP for North Dorset (1997–2015)
Sir Dennis Walters; MP for Kingston upon Hull North West (1918–1945)
David Warburton; MP for Somerton and Frome (2010–present)
Sir Albert Lambert Ward, 1st Baronet; MP for Westbury (1964–1992)
Christopher Ward; MP for Swindon (1969–1970)
Dame Irene Ward; MP for Wallsend (1931–1945) and Tynemouth (1950–1974)
Sir John Ward; MP for Poole (1979–1997)
Sarah Ward; MP for Cannock (1931–1935)
William Ward, 3rd Earl of Dudley
Thomas Waring; MP for North Down (1885–1898)
John Wardlaw-Milne
Charles Wardle
William Ward Warner
Matt Warman; MP for Boston and Skegness (2015–present)
Kenneth Warren
Robert Warren; MP for Dublin University (1867–1868)
Sir Victor Warrender, 8th Baronet; MP for Grantham (1923–1942)
Charles Warton
Nigel Waterson; MP for Eastbourne (1992–2010)
Dame Angela Watkinson; MP for Upminster (2001–2010) and Hornchurch and Upminster (2010–2017)
Harold Watkinson, 1st Viscount Watkinson
Giles Watling; MP for Clacton (2017–present)
John Watson
William Watson, Baron Watson
William Watson, Baron Thankerton
James Watts; MP for Manchester Moss Side (1959–1961)
John Arthur Watts
Sir Thomas Watts; MP for Manchester Withington (1922–1923; 1924–1929)
Bernard Weatherill; MP for Croydon North East (1964–1983)
Suzanne Webb; MP for Stourbridge (2019–present)
Harold Webbe
David Webster; MP for Weston-super-Mare (1958–1969)
Sir Richard Webster; MP for Launceston (1885) and Isle of Wight (1885–1900)
Lord Charles Wellesley
Bowen Wells
Sir John Wells; MP for Maidstone (1959–1987)
Willard Garfield Weston; MP for Macclesfield (1939–1945)
Helen Whately; MP for Faversham and Mid Kent (2015–present)
Sir Mervyn Wheatley; MP for East Dorset (1945–1950) and Poole (1950–1951)
Heather Wheeler; MP for South Derbyshire (2010–present)
Sir John Wheeler; MP for Paddington (1979–1983) and Westminster North (1983–1997)
Sir Granville Wheler, 1st Baronet; MP for Faversham (1910–1928)
Roger White; MP for Gravesend (1970–1974)
Graeme Alexander Lockhart Whitelaw; MP for North West Lanarkshire (1892–1895)
William Whitelaw; MP for Perth (1892–1895)
William Whitelaw; MP for Penrith and The Border (1955–1983)
George Whiteley; MP for Stockport (1893–1900)
John Whiteley; MP for Buckingham (1937–1943)
James Whiteside; MP for Enniskillen (1851–1859) and Dublin University (1859–1866)
John Whitfield; MP for Dewsbury (1983–1987)
Sir Ray Whitney; MP for Wycombe (1978–2001)
Craig Whittaker; MP for Calder Valley (2010–present)
John Whittingdale; MP for South Colchester and Maldon (1992–1997), Maldon and East Chelmsford (1997–2010) and Maldon (2010–present)
Jardine Whyte; MP for North East Derbyshire (1931–1935)
Keith Wickenden; MP for Dorking (1979–1983)
Edward Wickham; MP for Taunton (1935–1945)
William Wickham; MP for Petersfield (1892–1897)
Ann Widdecombe; MP for Maidstone (1987–1997) and Maidstone and The Weald (1997–2010)
Bill Wiggin; MP for Leominster (2001–2010) and North Herefordshire (2010–present)
Sir Jerry Wiggin; MP for Weston-super-Mare (1969–1997)
Loftus Wigram; MP for Cambridge University (1850–1859)
James Wild; MP for North West Norfolk (2019–present)
John Wilkinson; MP for Bradford West (1970–1974) and Ruislip-Northwood (1979–2005)
David Willetts; MP for Havant (1992–2015)
Francis Willey, 2nd Baron Barnby
Craig Williams; MP for Cardiff North (2015–2017) and Montgomeryshire (2019–present)
Delwyn Williams
Donald Williams; MP for Dudley (1968–1970)
Herbert Williams
Paul Williams
Sir Robert Williams, 1st Baronet; MP for West Dorset (1895–1922)
Sir Gavin Williamson; MP for South Staffordshire (2010–present)
Charles Williams-Wynn; MP for Montgomeryshire (1834–1850)
Charles Williams-Wynn; MP for Montgomeryshire (1862–1880)
Herbert Watkin Williams-Wynn; MP for Montgomeryshire (1850–1862)
Henry Willink; MP for Croydon North (1940–1948)
Gilbert Wills, 1st Baron Dulverton
Gerald Wills
Wilfrid Wills; MP for Batley and Morley (1931–1935)
David Wilshire
Geoffrey Wilson
Henry Hughes Wilson
Rob Wilson; MP for Reading East (2005–2017)
Sir Samuel Wilson; MP for Portsmouth (1886–1892)
William Wilson; MP for Donegal (1876–1879)
Lewis Winby; MP for Harborough (1924–1929)
Ivor Windsor-Clive, 2nd Earl of Plymouth
Rowland Winn; MP for North Lincolnshire (1868–1885)
Rowland Winn; MP for Pontefract (1885–1893)
Ann Winterton; MP for Congleton (1983–2010)
Sir Nicholas Winterton; MP for Macclesfield (1971–2010)
Roy Wise
Edmond Wodehouse
Gustav Wilhelm Wolff
Mark Wolfson
Sarah Wollaston; MP for Totnes (2010–2019)
Patrick Wolrige-Gordon
Walter Womersley
Charles Wood, 2nd Earl of Halifax
Edward Wood, Lord Irwin; MP for Ripon (1910–1925)
Sir John Wood, 1st Baronet
Kingsley Wood
Mike Wood; MP for Dudley South (2015–present)
Richard Wood, Baron Holderness
Thomas Wood; MP for Middlesex (1837–1847)
Timothy Wood; MP for Stevenage (1983–1997)
Mike Woodcock; MP for Ellesmere Port and Neston (1983–1992)
Montague Woodhouse, 5th Baron Terrington
Mark Woodnutt
Shaun Woodward; MP for Witney (1997–1999)
John Woollam
Sir Marcus Worsley, 5th Baronet; MP for Keighley (1959–1964) and Chelsea (1966–1974)
Henry de Worms, 1st Baron Pirbright
Laming Worthington-Evans
Sir Herbert Wragg; MP for Belper (1923–1929; 1931–1945)
William Wragg; MP for Hazel Grove (2015–present)
Beatrice Wright; MP for Bodmin (1941–1945)
Esmond Wright
Henry FitzHerbert Wright
Jeremy Wright; MP for Rugby and Kenilworth (2005–2010) and Kenilworth and Southam (2010–present)
Wallace Duffield Wright
Harry Wrightson; MP for Leyton West (1918–1919)
George Wyndham
Sir Henry Wyndham; MP for Cockermouth (1852–1857) and West Cumberland (1857–1860)
Henry Wyndham; MP for West Sussex (1854–1869)
Edwin Wyndham-Quin, 3rd Viscount Adare; MP for Glamorganshire (1837–1851)
William Robert Maurice Wynne; MP for Merioneth (1865–1868)
William Watkin Edward Wynne; MP for Merioneth (1859–1865)
Marmaduke D'Arcy Wyvill; MP for Otley (1895–1900)

Y
Sir John Yarde-Buller, 3rd Baronet; MP for South Devon (1835–1858)
Sir Charles Yate, 1st Baronet; MP for Melton (1910–1924)
William Yates; MP for The Wrekin (1955–1966)
James Yeaman; MP for Dundee (1879–1880)
Tim Yeo; MP for South Suffolk (1983–2015)
Robert Yerburgh; MP for City of Chester (1886–1906; 1910–1916)
John Yorke; MP for Tewkesbury (1864–1968; 1885–1886) and East Gloucestershire (1872–1885)
Charles Young; MP for Christchurch (1885–1892)
Sir George Young, 6th Baronet; MP for Acton (1974–1983), Ealing Acton (1983–1997) and North West Hampshire (1997–2015)
Hilton Young; MP for Norwich (1926–1929) and Sevenoaks (1929–1935)
Jacob Young; MP for Redcar (2019–present)
Sir John Young, 2nd Baronet; MP for Cavan (1834–1843; 1853–1855)
Oliver Young; MP for Wokingham (1898–1901)
George Younger, 1st Baronet; MP for Ayr Burghs (1906–1922)
George Younger, 4th Baronet; MP for Ayr (1964–1992)

Z
Nadhim Zahawi; MP for Stratford-on-Avon (2010–present)

See also

History of the Conservative Party